

357001–357100 

|-bgcolor=#E9E9E9
| 357001 ||  || — || October 23, 1998 || Kitt Peak || Spacewatch || JUN || align=right data-sort-value="0.93" | 930 m || 
|-id=002 bgcolor=#E9E9E9
| 357002 ||  || — || January 10, 1999 || Kitt Peak || Spacewatch || HOF || align=right | 2.9 km || 
|-id=003 bgcolor=#E9E9E9
| 357003 ||  || — || January 8, 1999 || Kitt Peak || Spacewatch || — || align=right | 2.1 km || 
|-id=004 bgcolor=#fefefe
| 357004 ||  || — || March 18, 1999 || Kitt Peak || Spacewatch || V || align=right data-sort-value="0.77" | 770 m || 
|-id=005 bgcolor=#FFC2E0
| 357005 ||  || — || April 20, 1999 || Socorro || LINEAR || APO +1kmcritical || align=right data-sort-value="0.93" | 930 m || 
|-id=006 bgcolor=#E9E9E9
| 357006 ||  || — || September 8, 1999 || Catalina || CSS || — || align=right | 1.2 km || 
|-id=007 bgcolor=#d6d6d6
| 357007 ||  || — || October 7, 1999 || Kitt Peak || Spacewatch || — || align=right | 3.4 km || 
|-id=008 bgcolor=#d6d6d6
| 357008 ||  || — || October 10, 1999 || Kitt Peak || Spacewatch || — || align=right | 3.4 km || 
|-id=009 bgcolor=#E9E9E9
| 357009 ||  || — || October 4, 1999 || Socorro || LINEAR || — || align=right | 1.1 km || 
|-id=010 bgcolor=#fefefe
| 357010 ||  || — || October 9, 1999 || Socorro || LINEAR || — || align=right | 1.0 km || 
|-id=011 bgcolor=#d6d6d6
| 357011 ||  || — || October 16, 1999 || Kitt Peak || Spacewatch || — || align=right | 3.5 km || 
|-id=012 bgcolor=#E9E9E9
| 357012 ||  || — || November 2, 1999 || Socorro || LINEAR || — || align=right | 2.2 km || 
|-id=013 bgcolor=#fefefe
| 357013 ||  || — || November 5, 1999 || Socorro || LINEAR || — || align=right | 1.1 km || 
|-id=014 bgcolor=#E9E9E9
| 357014 ||  || — || November 9, 1999 || Socorro || LINEAR || — || align=right | 1.1 km || 
|-id=015 bgcolor=#d6d6d6
| 357015 ||  || — || November 9, 1999 || Kitt Peak || Spacewatch || — || align=right | 3.9 km || 
|-id=016 bgcolor=#fefefe
| 357016 ||  || — || November 9, 1999 || Kitt Peak || Spacewatch || V || align=right data-sort-value="0.76" | 760 m || 
|-id=017 bgcolor=#E9E9E9
| 357017 ||  || — || October 14, 1999 || Kitt Peak || Spacewatch || — || align=right | 1.1 km || 
|-id=018 bgcolor=#fefefe
| 357018 ||  || — || November 14, 1999 || Socorro || LINEAR || — || align=right | 1.7 km || 
|-id=019 bgcolor=#E9E9E9
| 357019 ||  || — || November 29, 1999 || Kitt Peak || Spacewatch || — || align=right data-sort-value="0.80" | 800 m || 
|-id=020 bgcolor=#E9E9E9
| 357020 ||  || — || December 6, 1999 || Socorro || LINEAR || — || align=right | 1.5 km || 
|-id=021 bgcolor=#E9E9E9
| 357021 ||  || — || December 13, 1999 || Kitt Peak || Spacewatch || EUN || align=right | 1.4 km || 
|-id=022 bgcolor=#FFC2E0
| 357022 ||  || — || December 20, 1999 || Socorro || LINEAR || APOPHA || align=right data-sort-value="0.43" | 430 m || 
|-id=023 bgcolor=#FA8072
| 357023 ||  || — || December 19, 1999 || Socorro || LINEAR || — || align=right | 2.2 km || 
|-id=024 bgcolor=#FFC2E0
| 357024 ||  || — || December 31, 1999 || Anderson Mesa || LONEOS || APOPHA || align=right data-sort-value="0.26" | 260 m || 
|-id=025 bgcolor=#E9E9E9
| 357025 ||  || — || February 29, 2000 || Socorro || LINEAR || — || align=right | 1.8 km || 
|-id=026 bgcolor=#E9E9E9
| 357026 ||  || — || February 28, 2000 || Socorro || LINEAR || — || align=right | 2.0 km || 
|-id=027 bgcolor=#E9E9E9
| 357027 ||  || — || March 3, 2000 || Socorro || LINEAR || — || align=right | 1.7 km || 
|-id=028 bgcolor=#FFC2E0
| 357028 ||  || — || March 4, 2000 || Socorro || LINEAR || APOPHA || align=right data-sort-value="0.47" | 470 m || 
|-id=029 bgcolor=#fefefe
| 357029 ||  || — || March 11, 2000 || Socorro || LINEAR || H || align=right data-sort-value="0.80" | 800 m || 
|-id=030 bgcolor=#E9E9E9
| 357030 ||  || — || March 6, 2000 || Haleakala || NEAT || — || align=right | 1.7 km || 
|-id=031 bgcolor=#E9E9E9
| 357031 ||  || — || March 25, 2000 || Kitt Peak || Spacewatch || — || align=right | 1.7 km || 
|-id=032 bgcolor=#E9E9E9
| 357032 ||  || — || April 25, 2000 || Kitt Peak || Spacewatch || — || align=right | 2.2 km || 
|-id=033 bgcolor=#E9E9E9
| 357033 ||  || — || April 29, 2000 || Socorro || LINEAR || ADE || align=right | 3.3 km || 
|-id=034 bgcolor=#fefefe
| 357034 ||  || — || May 28, 2000 || Anderson Mesa || LONEOS || H || align=right | 1.1 km || 
|-id=035 bgcolor=#FA8072
| 357035 ||  || — || June 8, 2000 || Kitt Peak || Spacewatch || — || align=right data-sort-value="0.81" | 810 m || 
|-id=036 bgcolor=#E9E9E9
| 357036 ||  || — || June 6, 2000 || Kitt Peak || Spacewatch || — || align=right | 2.3 km || 
|-id=037 bgcolor=#FA8072
| 357037 ||  || — || July 5, 2000 || Anderson Mesa || LONEOS || — || align=right | 1.2 km || 
|-id=038 bgcolor=#fefefe
| 357038 ||  || — || August 24, 2000 || Socorro || LINEAR || — || align=right | 1.1 km || 
|-id=039 bgcolor=#fefefe
| 357039 ||  || — || August 29, 2000 || Socorro || LINEAR || H || align=right | 1.1 km || 
|-id=040 bgcolor=#fefefe
| 357040 ||  || — || August 25, 2000 || Socorro || LINEAR || FLO || align=right | 1.6 km || 
|-id=041 bgcolor=#fefefe
| 357041 ||  || — || August 31, 2000 || Socorro || LINEAR || FLO || align=right data-sort-value="0.81" | 810 m || 
|-id=042 bgcolor=#fefefe
| 357042 ||  || — || September 1, 2000 || Socorro || LINEAR || FLO || align=right data-sort-value="0.83" | 830 m || 
|-id=043 bgcolor=#fefefe
| 357043 ||  || — || September 3, 2000 || Socorro || LINEAR || — || align=right data-sort-value="0.91" | 910 m || 
|-id=044 bgcolor=#fefefe
| 357044 ||  || — || September 24, 2000 || Socorro || LINEAR || V || align=right data-sort-value="0.87" | 870 m || 
|-id=045 bgcolor=#fefefe
| 357045 ||  || — || September 24, 2000 || Socorro || LINEAR || FLO || align=right data-sort-value="0.77" | 770 m || 
|-id=046 bgcolor=#fefefe
| 357046 ||  || — || September 24, 2000 || Socorro || LINEAR || NYS || align=right data-sort-value="0.73" | 730 m || 
|-id=047 bgcolor=#d6d6d6
| 357047 ||  || — || September 28, 2000 || Socorro || LINEAR || — || align=right | 2.9 km || 
|-id=048 bgcolor=#fefefe
| 357048 ||  || — || September 24, 2000 || Socorro || LINEAR || — || align=right | 1.0 km || 
|-id=049 bgcolor=#fefefe
| 357049 ||  || — || September 24, 2000 || Socorro || LINEAR || V || align=right data-sort-value="0.79" | 790 m || 
|-id=050 bgcolor=#d6d6d6
| 357050 ||  || — || October 22, 2000 || Ondřejov || P. Kušnirák || — || align=right | 4.0 km || 
|-id=051 bgcolor=#E9E9E9
| 357051 ||  || — || November 22, 2000 || Kitt Peak || Spacewatch || — || align=right | 1.6 km || 
|-id=052 bgcolor=#fefefe
| 357052 ||  || — || November 21, 2000 || Socorro || LINEAR || — || align=right data-sort-value="0.94" | 940 m || 
|-id=053 bgcolor=#E9E9E9
| 357053 ||  || — || November 20, 2000 || Socorro || LINEAR || — || align=right | 2.0 km || 
|-id=054 bgcolor=#fefefe
| 357054 ||  || — || November 30, 2000 || Socorro || LINEAR || — || align=right | 1.2 km || 
|-id=055 bgcolor=#fefefe
| 357055 ||  || — || December 30, 2000 || Socorro || LINEAR || — || align=right | 1.4 km || 
|-id=056 bgcolor=#E9E9E9
| 357056 ||  || — || June 27, 2001 || Palomar || NEAT || — || align=right | 2.0 km || 
|-id=057 bgcolor=#E9E9E9
| 357057 ||  || — || June 26, 2001 || Palomar || NEAT || — || align=right | 2.1 km || 
|-id=058 bgcolor=#FFC2E0
| 357058 ||  || — || July 23, 2001 || Palomar || NEAT || AMO || align=right data-sort-value="0.33" | 330 m || 
|-id=059 bgcolor=#E9E9E9
| 357059 ||  || — || July 20, 2001 || Palomar || NEAT || — || align=right | 2.7 km || 
|-id=060 bgcolor=#FA8072
| 357060 ||  || — || July 27, 2001 || Anderson Mesa || LONEOS || PHO || align=right | 1.4 km || 
|-id=061 bgcolor=#fefefe
| 357061 ||  || — || August 15, 2001 || Haleakala || NEAT || FLO || align=right data-sort-value="0.79" | 790 m || 
|-id=062 bgcolor=#fefefe
| 357062 ||  || — || August 14, 2001 || Haleakala || NEAT || FLO || align=right data-sort-value="0.68" | 680 m || 
|-id=063 bgcolor=#FA8072
| 357063 ||  || — || August 14, 2001 || Haleakala || NEAT || — || align=right data-sort-value="0.87" | 870 m || 
|-id=064 bgcolor=#fefefe
| 357064 ||  || — || August 17, 2001 || Palomar || NEAT || H || align=right data-sort-value="0.86" | 860 m || 
|-id=065 bgcolor=#E9E9E9
| 357065 ||  || — || August 17, 2001 || Socorro || LINEAR || — || align=right | 1.7 km || 
|-id=066 bgcolor=#E9E9E9
| 357066 ||  || — || August 16, 2001 || Socorro || LINEAR || — || align=right | 2.4 km || 
|-id=067 bgcolor=#E9E9E9
| 357067 ||  || — || August 17, 2001 || Socorro || LINEAR || — || align=right | 3.6 km || 
|-id=068 bgcolor=#E9E9E9
| 357068 ||  || — || August 16, 2001 || Palomar || NEAT || — || align=right | 2.3 km || 
|-id=069 bgcolor=#fefefe
| 357069 ||  || — || August 23, 2001 || Socorro || LINEAR || H || align=right | 1.0 km || 
|-id=070 bgcolor=#fefefe
| 357070 ||  || — || August 14, 2001 || Bergisch Gladbach || W. Bickel || FLO || align=right data-sort-value="0.56" | 560 m || 
|-id=071 bgcolor=#E9E9E9
| 357071 ||  || — || August 24, 2001 || Socorro || LINEAR || — || align=right | 2.7 km || 
|-id=072 bgcolor=#fefefe
| 357072 ||  || — || September 10, 2001 || Desert Eagle || W. K. Y. Yeung || — || align=right | 1.1 km || 
|-id=073 bgcolor=#E9E9E9
| 357073 ||  || — || September 7, 2001 || Socorro || LINEAR || EUN || align=right | 1.5 km || 
|-id=074 bgcolor=#E9E9E9
| 357074 ||  || — || September 7, 2001 || Palomar || NEAT || — || align=right | 2.0 km || 
|-id=075 bgcolor=#E9E9E9
| 357075 ||  || — || September 12, 2001 || Socorro || LINEAR || — || align=right | 2.5 km || 
|-id=076 bgcolor=#fefefe
| 357076 ||  || — || September 11, 2001 || Anderson Mesa || LONEOS || — || align=right data-sort-value="0.72" | 720 m || 
|-id=077 bgcolor=#d6d6d6
| 357077 ||  || — || September 12, 2001 || Socorro || LINEAR || — || align=right | 3.9 km || 
|-id=078 bgcolor=#E9E9E9
| 357078 ||  || — || September 12, 2001 || Socorro || LINEAR || HNA || align=right | 2.2 km || 
|-id=079 bgcolor=#E9E9E9
| 357079 ||  || — || September 12, 2001 || Socorro || LINEAR || — || align=right | 1.7 km || 
|-id=080 bgcolor=#E9E9E9
| 357080 ||  || — || September 18, 2001 || Kitt Peak || Spacewatch || NEM || align=right | 1.9 km || 
|-id=081 bgcolor=#fefefe
| 357081 ||  || — || September 16, 2001 || Socorro || LINEAR || H || align=right data-sort-value="0.86" | 860 m || 
|-id=082 bgcolor=#fefefe
| 357082 ||  || — || September 16, 2001 || Socorro || LINEAR || — || align=right data-sort-value="0.95" | 950 m || 
|-id=083 bgcolor=#E9E9E9
| 357083 ||  || — || September 16, 2001 || Socorro || LINEAR || — || align=right | 2.9 km || 
|-id=084 bgcolor=#E9E9E9
| 357084 ||  || — || September 16, 2001 || Socorro || LINEAR || — || align=right | 3.0 km || 
|-id=085 bgcolor=#fefefe
| 357085 ||  || — || September 19, 2001 || Socorro || LINEAR || — || align=right data-sort-value="0.64" | 640 m || 
|-id=086 bgcolor=#E9E9E9
| 357086 ||  || — || September 19, 2001 || Socorro || LINEAR || WIT || align=right | 1.3 km || 
|-id=087 bgcolor=#E9E9E9
| 357087 ||  || — || September 19, 2001 || Socorro || LINEAR || — || align=right | 2.6 km || 
|-id=088 bgcolor=#d6d6d6
| 357088 ||  || — || September 19, 2001 || Socorro || LINEAR || — || align=right | 2.5 km || 
|-id=089 bgcolor=#E9E9E9
| 357089 ||  || — || September 19, 2001 || Kitt Peak || Spacewatch || HOF || align=right | 2.6 km || 
|-id=090 bgcolor=#d6d6d6
| 357090 ||  || — || August 25, 2001 || Kitt Peak || Spacewatch || — || align=right | 2.6 km || 
|-id=091 bgcolor=#E9E9E9
| 357091 ||  || — || September 20, 2001 || Socorro || LINEAR || AGN || align=right | 1.1 km || 
|-id=092 bgcolor=#fefefe
| 357092 ||  || — || September 21, 2001 || Socorro || LINEAR || — || align=right data-sort-value="0.87" | 870 m || 
|-id=093 bgcolor=#E9E9E9
| 357093 ||  || — || September 30, 2006 || Mount Lemmon || Mount Lemmon Survey || XIZ || align=right | 1.5 km || 
|-id=094 bgcolor=#FA8072
| 357094 ||  || — || August 19, 2001 || Socorro || LINEAR || — || align=right data-sort-value="0.95" | 950 m || 
|-id=095 bgcolor=#fefefe
| 357095 ||  || — || October 13, 2001 || Socorro || LINEAR || H || align=right data-sort-value="0.90" | 900 m || 
|-id=096 bgcolor=#fefefe
| 357096 ||  || — || October 15, 2001 || Emerald Lane || L. Ball || — || align=right data-sort-value="0.67" | 670 m || 
|-id=097 bgcolor=#fefefe
| 357097 ||  || — || October 14, 2001 || Socorro || LINEAR || — || align=right data-sort-value="0.92" | 920 m || 
|-id=098 bgcolor=#fefefe
| 357098 ||  || — || September 20, 2001 || Socorro || LINEAR || FLO || align=right data-sort-value="0.72" | 720 m || 
|-id=099 bgcolor=#fefefe
| 357099 ||  || — || October 13, 2001 || Palomar || NEAT || — || align=right data-sort-value="0.83" | 830 m || 
|-id=100 bgcolor=#E9E9E9
| 357100 ||  || — || October 10, 2001 || Palomar || NEAT || — || align=right | 2.5 km || 
|}

357101–357200 

|-bgcolor=#fefefe
| 357101 ||  || — || October 14, 2001 || Kitt Peak || Spacewatch || NYS || align=right data-sort-value="0.56" | 560 m || 
|-id=102 bgcolor=#d6d6d6
| 357102 ||  || — || October 15, 2001 || Palomar || NEAT || — || align=right | 3.4 km || 
|-id=103 bgcolor=#fefefe
| 357103 ||  || — || October 11, 2001 || Palomar || NEAT || — || align=right data-sort-value="0.68" | 680 m || 
|-id=104 bgcolor=#fefefe
| 357104 ||  || — || October 13, 2001 || Palomar || NEAT || — || align=right data-sort-value="0.78" | 780 m || 
|-id=105 bgcolor=#E9E9E9
| 357105 ||  || — || October 14, 2001 || Palomar || NEAT || JUN || align=right | 1.7 km || 
|-id=106 bgcolor=#E9E9E9
| 357106 ||  || — || October 10, 2001 || Palomar || NEAT || — || align=right | 2.9 km || 
|-id=107 bgcolor=#fefefe
| 357107 ||  || — || October 17, 2001 || Socorro || LINEAR || — || align=right | 1.2 km || 
|-id=108 bgcolor=#fefefe
| 357108 ||  || — || October 17, 2001 || Socorro || LINEAR || — || align=right data-sort-value="0.97" | 970 m || 
|-id=109 bgcolor=#fefefe
| 357109 ||  || — || October 17, 2001 || Kitt Peak || Spacewatch || — || align=right data-sort-value="0.73" | 730 m || 
|-id=110 bgcolor=#E9E9E9
| 357110 ||  || — || October 17, 2001 || Socorro || LINEAR || — || align=right | 3.1 km || 
|-id=111 bgcolor=#fefefe
| 357111 ||  || — || October 20, 2001 || Socorro || LINEAR || FLO || align=right data-sort-value="0.64" | 640 m || 
|-id=112 bgcolor=#fefefe
| 357112 ||  || — || November 9, 2001 || Socorro || LINEAR || — || align=right data-sort-value="0.94" | 940 m || 
|-id=113 bgcolor=#fefefe
| 357113 ||  || — || November 9, 2001 || Socorro || LINEAR || — || align=right data-sort-value="0.97" | 970 m || 
|-id=114 bgcolor=#d6d6d6
| 357114 ||  || — || November 12, 2001 || Socorro || LINEAR || — || align=right | 3.1 km || 
|-id=115 bgcolor=#fefefe
| 357115 ||  || — || October 26, 2001 || Palomar || NEAT || — || align=right data-sort-value="0.76" | 760 m || 
|-id=116 bgcolor=#d6d6d6
| 357116 Attivissimo || 2001 WH ||  || November 16, 2001 || Cavezzo || Cavezzo Obs. || — || align=right | 2.5 km || 
|-id=117 bgcolor=#FA8072
| 357117 ||  || — || November 27, 2001 || Socorro || LINEAR || Tj (2.91) || align=right | 3.1 km || 
|-id=118 bgcolor=#d6d6d6
| 357118 ||  || — || November 19, 2001 || Socorro || LINEAR || — || align=right | 3.5 km || 
|-id=119 bgcolor=#fefefe
| 357119 ||  || — || November 20, 2001 || Socorro || LINEAR || — || align=right data-sort-value="0.71" | 710 m || 
|-id=120 bgcolor=#fefefe
| 357120 ||  || — || November 20, 2001 || Socorro || LINEAR || — || align=right data-sort-value="0.69" | 690 m || 
|-id=121 bgcolor=#fefefe
| 357121 ||  || — || December 10, 2001 || Socorro || LINEAR || H || align=right data-sort-value="0.95" | 950 m || 
|-id=122 bgcolor=#fefefe
| 357122 ||  || — || December 10, 2001 || Socorro || LINEAR || — || align=right | 1.0 km || 
|-id=123 bgcolor=#fefefe
| 357123 ||  || — || December 14, 2001 || Socorro || LINEAR || FLO || align=right data-sort-value="0.82" | 820 m || 
|-id=124 bgcolor=#fefefe
| 357124 ||  || — || December 15, 2001 || Socorro || LINEAR || — || align=right data-sort-value="0.82" | 820 m || 
|-id=125 bgcolor=#fefefe
| 357125 ||  || — || December 15, 2001 || Socorro || LINEAR || — || align=right data-sort-value="0.86" | 860 m || 
|-id=126 bgcolor=#FA8072
| 357126 ||  || — || November 19, 2001 || Socorro || LINEAR || — || align=right data-sort-value="0.95" | 950 m || 
|-id=127 bgcolor=#d6d6d6
| 357127 ||  || — || December 14, 2001 || Kitt Peak || Spacewatch || — || align=right | 2.5 km || 
|-id=128 bgcolor=#fefefe
| 357128 ||  || — || December 13, 2001 || Palomar || NEAT || — || align=right data-sort-value="0.73" | 730 m || 
|-id=129 bgcolor=#FA8072
| 357129 ||  || — || December 9, 2001 || Mauna Kea || D. J. Tholen || — || align=right data-sort-value="0.88" | 880 m || 
|-id=130 bgcolor=#fefefe
| 357130 ||  || — || December 18, 2001 || Socorro || LINEAR || — || align=right | 1.00 km || 
|-id=131 bgcolor=#d6d6d6
| 357131 ||  || — || December 19, 2001 || Palomar || NEAT || — || align=right | 3.8 km || 
|-id=132 bgcolor=#fefefe
| 357132 ||  || — || January 9, 2002 || Socorro || LINEAR || H || align=right data-sort-value="0.92" | 920 m || 
|-id=133 bgcolor=#fefefe
| 357133 ||  || — || December 17, 2001 || Socorro || LINEAR || — || align=right data-sort-value="0.82" | 820 m || 
|-id=134 bgcolor=#fefefe
| 357134 ||  || — || January 9, 2002 || Socorro || LINEAR || NYS || align=right data-sort-value="0.58" | 580 m || 
|-id=135 bgcolor=#fefefe
| 357135 ||  || — || January 9, 2002 || Socorro || LINEAR || — || align=right | 1.2 km || 
|-id=136 bgcolor=#fefefe
| 357136 ||  || — || January 15, 2002 || Kingsnake || J. V. McClusky || PHO || align=right | 1.1 km || 
|-id=137 bgcolor=#fefefe
| 357137 ||  || — || January 9, 2002 || Socorro || LINEAR || PHO || align=right data-sort-value="0.98" | 980 m || 
|-id=138 bgcolor=#d6d6d6
| 357138 ||  || — || January 13, 2002 || Socorro || LINEAR || — || align=right | 2.2 km || 
|-id=139 bgcolor=#d6d6d6
| 357139 ||  || — || January 14, 2002 || Socorro || LINEAR || — || align=right | 3.4 km || 
|-id=140 bgcolor=#d6d6d6
| 357140 ||  || — || January 13, 2002 || Socorro || LINEAR || — || align=right | 4.3 km || 
|-id=141 bgcolor=#fefefe
| 357141 ||  || — || January 14, 2002 || Socorro || LINEAR || — || align=right | 1.1 km || 
|-id=142 bgcolor=#fefefe
| 357142 ||  || — || January 12, 2002 || Kitt Peak || Spacewatch || — || align=right data-sort-value="0.69" | 690 m || 
|-id=143 bgcolor=#fefefe
| 357143 ||  || — || January 13, 2002 || Kitt Peak || Spacewatch || V || align=right data-sort-value="0.72" | 720 m || 
|-id=144 bgcolor=#d6d6d6
| 357144 ||  || — || January 8, 2002 || Palomar || NEAT || — || align=right | 2.5 km || 
|-id=145 bgcolor=#fefefe
| 357145 ||  || — || January 14, 2002 || Kitt Peak || Spacewatch || — || align=right data-sort-value="0.69" | 690 m || 
|-id=146 bgcolor=#fefefe
| 357146 ||  || — || January 21, 2002 || Kitt Peak || Spacewatch || — || align=right data-sort-value="0.93" | 930 m || 
|-id=147 bgcolor=#FA8072
| 357147 || 2002 CS || — || February 2, 2002 || Cima Ekar || ADAS || H || align=right data-sort-value="0.72" | 720 m || 
|-id=148 bgcolor=#fefefe
| 357148 ||  || — || February 2, 2002 || Cima Ekar || ADAS || V || align=right data-sort-value="0.85" | 850 m || 
|-id=149 bgcolor=#fefefe
| 357149 ||  || — || February 3, 2002 || Palomar || NEAT || — || align=right data-sort-value="0.89" | 890 m || 
|-id=150 bgcolor=#d6d6d6
| 357150 ||  || — || February 1, 2002 || Socorro || LINEAR || Tj (2.96) || align=right | 2.5 km || 
|-id=151 bgcolor=#d6d6d6
| 357151 ||  || — || February 6, 2002 || Kitt Peak || Spacewatch || — || align=right | 4.0 km || 
|-id=152 bgcolor=#FA8072
| 357152 ||  || — || February 8, 2002 || Palomar || NEAT || — || align=right data-sort-value="0.99" | 990 m || 
|-id=153 bgcolor=#FA8072
| 357153 ||  || — || February 6, 2002 || Palomar || NEAT || — || align=right | 1.2 km || 
|-id=154 bgcolor=#d6d6d6
| 357154 ||  || — || February 3, 2002 || Palomar || NEAT || — || align=right | 3.1 km || 
|-id=155 bgcolor=#d6d6d6
| 357155 ||  || — || February 6, 2002 || Socorro || LINEAR || — || align=right | 4.1 km || 
|-id=156 bgcolor=#d6d6d6
| 357156 ||  || — || February 7, 2002 || Socorro || LINEAR || — || align=right | 4.8 km || 
|-id=157 bgcolor=#d6d6d6
| 357157 ||  || — || January 11, 2002 || Kitt Peak || Spacewatch || — || align=right | 2.8 km || 
|-id=158 bgcolor=#d6d6d6
| 357158 ||  || — || February 7, 2002 || Socorro || LINEAR || — || align=right | 3.6 km || 
|-id=159 bgcolor=#fefefe
| 357159 ||  || — || February 7, 2002 || Socorro || LINEAR || — || align=right | 1.3 km || 
|-id=160 bgcolor=#d6d6d6
| 357160 ||  || — || February 7, 2002 || Socorro || LINEAR || — || align=right | 2.6 km || 
|-id=161 bgcolor=#fefefe
| 357161 ||  || — || February 8, 2002 || Socorro || LINEAR || — || align=right | 1.2 km || 
|-id=162 bgcolor=#d6d6d6
| 357162 ||  || — || February 10, 2002 || Socorro || LINEAR || — || align=right | 2.9 km || 
|-id=163 bgcolor=#d6d6d6
| 357163 ||  || — || February 10, 2002 || Socorro || LINEAR || — || align=right | 2.6 km || 
|-id=164 bgcolor=#d6d6d6
| 357164 ||  || — || February 7, 2002 || Kitt Peak || Spacewatch || — || align=right | 4.1 km || 
|-id=165 bgcolor=#d6d6d6
| 357165 ||  || — || February 6, 2002 || Kitt Peak || M. W. Buie || THM || align=right | 2.3 km || 
|-id=166 bgcolor=#fefefe
| 357166 ||  || — || January 22, 2002 || Socorro || LINEAR || H || align=right data-sort-value="0.81" | 810 m || 
|-id=167 bgcolor=#d6d6d6
| 357167 ||  || — || February 6, 2002 || Kitt Peak || Spacewatch || — || align=right | 2.6 km || 
|-id=168 bgcolor=#d6d6d6
| 357168 ||  || — || February 7, 2002 || Palomar || NEAT || THM || align=right | 2.2 km || 
|-id=169 bgcolor=#fefefe
| 357169 ||  || — || February 10, 2002 || Socorro || LINEAR || — || align=right | 1.1 km || 
|-id=170 bgcolor=#fefefe
| 357170 ||  || — || February 6, 2002 || Palomar || NEAT || ERI || align=right | 1.7 km || 
|-id=171 bgcolor=#fefefe
| 357171 ||  || — || February 11, 2002 || Socorro || LINEAR || V || align=right data-sort-value="0.59" | 590 m || 
|-id=172 bgcolor=#d6d6d6
| 357172 ||  || — || February 22, 2002 || Nashville || R. Clingan || — || align=right | 4.3 km || 
|-id=173 bgcolor=#fefefe
| 357173 ||  || — || February 20, 2002 || Anderson Mesa || LONEOS || H || align=right data-sort-value="0.80" | 800 m || 
|-id=174 bgcolor=#fefefe
| 357174 ||  || — || March 12, 2002 || Socorro || LINEAR || H || align=right data-sort-value="0.80" | 800 m || 
|-id=175 bgcolor=#fefefe
| 357175 ||  || — || March 5, 2002 || Kitt Peak || Spacewatch || NYS || align=right data-sort-value="0.57" | 570 m || 
|-id=176 bgcolor=#fefefe
| 357176 ||  || — || March 5, 2002 || Kitt Peak || Spacewatch || MAS || align=right data-sort-value="0.54" | 540 m || 
|-id=177 bgcolor=#fefefe
| 357177 ||  || — || March 11, 2002 || Palomar || NEAT || ERI || align=right | 1.5 km || 
|-id=178 bgcolor=#d6d6d6
| 357178 ||  || — || March 13, 2002 || Socorro || LINEAR || — || align=right | 3.0 km || 
|-id=179 bgcolor=#d6d6d6
| 357179 ||  || — || March 13, 2002 || Socorro || LINEAR || — || align=right | 3.6 km || 
|-id=180 bgcolor=#fefefe
| 357180 ||  || — || March 11, 2002 || Kitt Peak || Spacewatch || — || align=right data-sort-value="0.75" | 750 m || 
|-id=181 bgcolor=#fefefe
| 357181 ||  || — || February 14, 2002 || Kitt Peak || Spacewatch || — || align=right data-sort-value="0.86" | 860 m || 
|-id=182 bgcolor=#fefefe
| 357182 ||  || — || March 12, 2002 || Socorro || LINEAR || — || align=right | 1.5 km || 
|-id=183 bgcolor=#C2FFFF
| 357183 ||  || — || March 9, 2002 || Kitt Peak || Spacewatch || L4 || align=right | 9.0 km || 
|-id=184 bgcolor=#fefefe
| 357184 ||  || — || March 9, 2002 || Anderson Mesa || LONEOS || H || align=right data-sort-value="0.86" | 860 m || 
|-id=185 bgcolor=#d6d6d6
| 357185 ||  || — || March 9, 2002 || Kitt Peak || Spacewatch || — || align=right | 3.0 km || 
|-id=186 bgcolor=#fefefe
| 357186 ||  || — || March 9, 2002 || Kitt Peak || Spacewatch || MAS || align=right data-sort-value="0.84" | 840 m || 
|-id=187 bgcolor=#fefefe
| 357187 ||  || — || March 10, 2002 || Kitt Peak || Spacewatch || NYS || align=right data-sort-value="0.68" | 680 m || 
|-id=188 bgcolor=#fefefe
| 357188 ||  || — || March 9, 2002 || Kitt Peak || Spacewatch || — || align=right data-sort-value="0.92" | 920 m || 
|-id=189 bgcolor=#fefefe
| 357189 ||  || — || March 12, 2002 || Palomar || NEAT || — || align=right data-sort-value="0.86" | 860 m || 
|-id=190 bgcolor=#fefefe
| 357190 ||  || — || March 15, 2002 || Palomar || NEAT || MAS || align=right data-sort-value="0.76" | 760 m || 
|-id=191 bgcolor=#d6d6d6
| 357191 ||  || — || March 5, 2002 || Anderson Mesa || LONEOS || — || align=right | 3.9 km || 
|-id=192 bgcolor=#fefefe
| 357192 ||  || — || March 11, 2002 || Palomar || NEAT || ERI || align=right | 1.4 km || 
|-id=193 bgcolor=#fefefe
| 357193 ||  || — || March 16, 2002 || Socorro || LINEAR || — || align=right | 1.1 km || 
|-id=194 bgcolor=#fefefe
| 357194 ||  || — || March 19, 2002 || Palomar || NEAT || — || align=right | 1.1 km || 
|-id=195 bgcolor=#d6d6d6
| 357195 ||  || — || March 20, 2002 || Socorro || LINEAR || — || align=right | 3.7 km || 
|-id=196 bgcolor=#d6d6d6
| 357196 ||  || — || March 20, 2002 || Palomar || NEAT || — || align=right | 4.5 km || 
|-id=197 bgcolor=#d6d6d6
| 357197 ||  || — || March 20, 2002 || Kitt Peak || Spacewatch || — || align=right | 4.3 km || 
|-id=198 bgcolor=#d6d6d6
| 357198 ||  || — || March 20, 2002 || Socorro || LINEAR || — || align=right | 3.5 km || 
|-id=199 bgcolor=#d6d6d6
| 357199 ||  || — || March 20, 2002 || Socorro || LINEAR || EUP || align=right | 3.9 km || 
|-id=200 bgcolor=#d6d6d6
| 357200 ||  || — || April 12, 2002 || Palomar || NEAT || EUP || align=right | 4.3 km || 
|}

357201–357300 

|-bgcolor=#fefefe
| 357201 ||  || — || April 12, 2002 || Palomar || NEAT || — || align=right | 1.2 km || 
|-id=202 bgcolor=#fefefe
| 357202 ||  || — || April 1, 2002 || Palomar || NEAT || — || align=right data-sort-value="0.87" | 870 m || 
|-id=203 bgcolor=#fefefe
| 357203 ||  || — || April 3, 2002 || Kitt Peak || Spacewatch || — || align=right data-sort-value="0.92" | 920 m || 
|-id=204 bgcolor=#d6d6d6
| 357204 ||  || — || April 1, 2002 || Palomar || NEAT || THB || align=right | 4.7 km || 
|-id=205 bgcolor=#fefefe
| 357205 ||  || — || April 4, 2002 || Haleakala || NEAT || — || align=right | 1.1 km || 
|-id=206 bgcolor=#d6d6d6
| 357206 ||  || — || April 8, 2002 || Palomar || NEAT || — || align=right | 3.9 km || 
|-id=207 bgcolor=#fefefe
| 357207 ||  || — || April 9, 2002 || Anderson Mesa || LONEOS || — || align=right | 1.0 km || 
|-id=208 bgcolor=#d6d6d6
| 357208 ||  || — || April 10, 2002 || Socorro || LINEAR || EUP || align=right | 6.0 km || 
|-id=209 bgcolor=#d6d6d6
| 357209 ||  || — || April 10, 2002 || Socorro || LINEAR || — || align=right | 5.1 km || 
|-id=210 bgcolor=#fefefe
| 357210 ||  || — || April 11, 2002 || Socorro || LINEAR || — || align=right data-sort-value="0.95" | 950 m || 
|-id=211 bgcolor=#fefefe
| 357211 ||  || — || April 12, 2002 || Socorro || LINEAR || — || align=right | 1.0 km || 
|-id=212 bgcolor=#d6d6d6
| 357212 ||  || — || April 13, 2002 || Kitt Peak || Spacewatch || — || align=right | 3.9 km || 
|-id=213 bgcolor=#d6d6d6
| 357213 ||  || — || April 13, 2002 || Kitt Peak || Spacewatch || LIX || align=right | 4.5 km || 
|-id=214 bgcolor=#fefefe
| 357214 ||  || — || April 10, 2002 || Socorro || LINEAR || ERI || align=right | 2.0 km || 
|-id=215 bgcolor=#fefefe
| 357215 ||  || — || April 8, 2002 || Palomar || NEAT || V || align=right data-sort-value="0.82" | 820 m || 
|-id=216 bgcolor=#d6d6d6
| 357216 ||  || — || November 26, 2005 || Mount Lemmon || Mount Lemmon Survey || THM || align=right | 2.4 km || 
|-id=217 bgcolor=#fefefe
| 357217 ||  || — || April 8, 2002 || Palomar || NEAT || MAS || align=right data-sort-value="0.75" | 750 m || 
|-id=218 bgcolor=#fefefe
| 357218 ||  || — || May 24, 2010 || WISE || WISE || ERI || align=right | 1.4 km || 
|-id=219 bgcolor=#d6d6d6
| 357219 ||  || — || September 18, 2010 || Mount Lemmon || Mount Lemmon Survey || — || align=right | 3.2 km || 
|-id=220 bgcolor=#d6d6d6
| 357220 ||  || — || April 19, 2002 || Kitt Peak || Spacewatch || — || align=right | 3.8 km || 
|-id=221 bgcolor=#d6d6d6
| 357221 ||  || — || April 17, 2002 || Socorro || LINEAR || EUP || align=right | 3.7 km || 
|-id=222 bgcolor=#d6d6d6
| 357222 ||  || — || May 5, 2002 || Palomar || NEAT || — || align=right | 3.8 km || 
|-id=223 bgcolor=#d6d6d6
| 357223 ||  || — || April 11, 2002 || Palomar || NEAT || — || align=right | 3.6 km || 
|-id=224 bgcolor=#fefefe
| 357224 ||  || — || May 8, 2002 || Socorro || LINEAR || — || align=right | 1.2 km || 
|-id=225 bgcolor=#d6d6d6
| 357225 ||  || — || May 9, 2002 || Socorro || LINEAR || — || align=right | 3.7 km || 
|-id=226 bgcolor=#d6d6d6
| 357226 ||  || — || May 10, 2002 || Socorro || LINEAR || — || align=right | 3.3 km || 
|-id=227 bgcolor=#fefefe
| 357227 ||  || — || May 11, 2002 || Socorro || LINEAR || MAS || align=right data-sort-value="0.90" | 900 m || 
|-id=228 bgcolor=#fefefe
| 357228 ||  || — || May 11, 2002 || Socorro || LINEAR || — || align=right | 1.2 km || 
|-id=229 bgcolor=#d6d6d6
| 357229 ||  || — || April 21, 2002 || Palomar || NEAT || — || align=right | 4.2 km || 
|-id=230 bgcolor=#d6d6d6
| 357230 ||  || — || April 6, 2002 || Kvistaberg || UDAS || EUP || align=right | 3.8 km || 
|-id=231 bgcolor=#fefefe
| 357231 ||  || — || May 7, 2002 || Palomar || NEAT || — || align=right | 1.2 km || 
|-id=232 bgcolor=#d6d6d6
| 357232 ||  || — || May 7, 2002 || Anderson Mesa || LONEOS || — || align=right | 4.9 km || 
|-id=233 bgcolor=#fefefe
| 357233 ||  || — || September 18, 1995 || Kitt Peak || Spacewatch || — || align=right data-sort-value="0.79" | 790 m || 
|-id=234 bgcolor=#fefefe
| 357234 ||  || — || May 4, 2002 || Kitt Peak || Spacewatch || MAS || align=right data-sort-value="0.79" | 790 m || 
|-id=235 bgcolor=#fefefe
| 357235 ||  || — || May 16, 2002 || Socorro || LINEAR || — || align=right | 2.5 km || 
|-id=236 bgcolor=#d6d6d6
| 357236 ||  || — || May 18, 2002 || Socorro || LINEAR || EUP || align=right | 3.6 km || 
|-id=237 bgcolor=#d6d6d6
| 357237 ||  || — || June 10, 2002 || Socorro || LINEAR || — || align=right | 5.1 km || 
|-id=238 bgcolor=#fefefe
| 357238 ||  || — || June 10, 2002 || Palomar || NEAT || — || align=right data-sort-value="0.91" | 910 m || 
|-id=239 bgcolor=#d6d6d6
| 357239 ||  || — || June 7, 2002 || Palomar || NEAT || — || align=right | 5.2 km || 
|-id=240 bgcolor=#fefefe
| 357240 ||  || — || June 12, 2002 || Palomar || NEAT || — || align=right | 1.00 km || 
|-id=241 bgcolor=#E9E9E9
| 357241 ||  || — || June 20, 2002 || Palomar || NEAT || — || align=right | 1.5 km || 
|-id=242 bgcolor=#E9E9E9
| 357242 ||  || — || July 29, 2002 || Palomar || S. F. Hönig || — || align=right | 1.2 km || 
|-id=243 bgcolor=#E9E9E9
| 357243 ||  || — || October 18, 2011 || Haleakala || Pan-STARRS || — || align=right | 1.8 km || 
|-id=244 bgcolor=#E9E9E9
| 357244 ||  || — || August 5, 2002 || Palomar || NEAT || — || align=right | 1.4 km || 
|-id=245 bgcolor=#E9E9E9
| 357245 ||  || — || August 6, 2002 || Palomar || NEAT || — || align=right | 1.6 km || 
|-id=246 bgcolor=#fefefe
| 357246 ||  || — || August 6, 2002 || Palomar || NEAT || — || align=right data-sort-value="0.85" | 850 m || 
|-id=247 bgcolor=#E9E9E9
| 357247 ||  || — || August 6, 2002 || Palomar || NEAT || — || align=right | 1.1 km || 
|-id=248 bgcolor=#E9E9E9
| 357248 ||  || — || August 10, 2002 || Socorro || LINEAR || — || align=right | 2.0 km || 
|-id=249 bgcolor=#E9E9E9
| 357249 ||  || — || August 6, 2002 || Palomar || NEAT || — || align=right | 1.0 km || 
|-id=250 bgcolor=#E9E9E9
| 357250 ||  || — || August 14, 2002 || Kitt Peak || Spacewatch || — || align=right | 1.1 km || 
|-id=251 bgcolor=#E9E9E9
| 357251 ||  || — || August 13, 2002 || Anderson Mesa || LONEOS || MIS || align=right | 3.1 km || 
|-id=252 bgcolor=#E9E9E9
| 357252 ||  || — || August 9, 2002 || Cerro Tololo || M. W. Buie || — || align=right | 1.0 km || 
|-id=253 bgcolor=#E9E9E9
| 357253 ||  || — || August 14, 2002 || Palomar || NEAT || — || align=right data-sort-value="0.90" | 900 m || 
|-id=254 bgcolor=#E9E9E9
| 357254 ||  || — || August 8, 2002 || Palomar || NEAT || — || align=right | 1.6 km || 
|-id=255 bgcolor=#E9E9E9
| 357255 ||  || — || August 15, 2002 || Palomar || NEAT || — || align=right | 3.0 km || 
|-id=256 bgcolor=#E9E9E9
| 357256 ||  || — || August 11, 2002 || Palomar || NEAT || — || align=right | 1.0 km || 
|-id=257 bgcolor=#E9E9E9
| 357257 ||  || — || August 7, 2002 || Palomar || NEAT || — || align=right | 1.0 km || 
|-id=258 bgcolor=#E9E9E9
| 357258 ||  || — || August 28, 2002 || Palomar || NEAT || — || align=right | 2.1 km || 
|-id=259 bgcolor=#E9E9E9
| 357259 ||  || — || August 18, 2002 || Palomar || S. F. Hönig || — || align=right | 1.7 km || 
|-id=260 bgcolor=#E9E9E9
| 357260 ||  || — || August 30, 2002 || Palomar || NEAT || — || align=right | 1.3 km || 
|-id=261 bgcolor=#E9E9E9
| 357261 ||  || — || August 18, 2002 || Palomar || NEAT || EUN || align=right | 1.4 km || 
|-id=262 bgcolor=#E9E9E9
| 357262 ||  || — || August 18, 2002 || Palomar || NEAT || — || align=right | 2.4 km || 
|-id=263 bgcolor=#E9E9E9
| 357263 ||  || — || February 28, 2010 || WISE || WISE || — || align=right | 2.2 km || 
|-id=264 bgcolor=#E9E9E9
| 357264 ||  || — || April 17, 2009 || Kitt Peak || Spacewatch || KON || align=right | 3.3 km || 
|-id=265 bgcolor=#E9E9E9
| 357265 ||  || — || April 10, 2005 || Mount Lemmon || Mount Lemmon Survey || — || align=right | 1.0 km || 
|-id=266 bgcolor=#E9E9E9
| 357266 ||  || — || March 3, 2005 || Kitt Peak || Spacewatch || — || align=right | 1.1 km || 
|-id=267 bgcolor=#E9E9E9
| 357267 ||  || — || February 1, 2009 || Kitt Peak || Spacewatch || EUN || align=right | 1.1 km || 
|-id=268 bgcolor=#E9E9E9
| 357268 ||  || — || September 4, 2002 || Anderson Mesa || LONEOS || — || align=right | 1.2 km || 
|-id=269 bgcolor=#E9E9E9
| 357269 ||  || — || September 5, 2002 || Socorro || LINEAR || — || align=right | 2.2 km || 
|-id=270 bgcolor=#E9E9E9
| 357270 ||  || — || September 5, 2002 || Socorro || LINEAR || — || align=right | 2.4 km || 
|-id=271 bgcolor=#E9E9E9
| 357271 ||  || — || September 12, 2002 || Goodricke-Pigott || R. A. Tucker || EUN || align=right | 1.7 km || 
|-id=272 bgcolor=#E9E9E9
| 357272 ||  || — || September 11, 2002 || Palomar || NEAT || — || align=right | 1.6 km || 
|-id=273 bgcolor=#E9E9E9
| 357273 ||  || — || September 5, 2002 || Haleakala || NEAT || — || align=right | 1.7 km || 
|-id=274 bgcolor=#E9E9E9
| 357274 ||  || — || September 15, 2002 || Palomar || NEAT || — || align=right | 1.5 km || 
|-id=275 bgcolor=#E9E9E9
| 357275 ||  || — || September 13, 2002 || Palomar || NEAT || — || align=right | 3.6 km || 
|-id=276 bgcolor=#E9E9E9
| 357276 ||  || — || September 12, 2002 || Palomar || NEAT || EUN || align=right | 1.5 km || 
|-id=277 bgcolor=#E9E9E9
| 357277 ||  || — || August 13, 2006 || Siding Spring || SSS || EUN || align=right | 1.7 km || 
|-id=278 bgcolor=#E9E9E9
| 357278 ||  || — || September 27, 2002 || Palomar || NEAT || MAR || align=right | 1.5 km || 
|-id=279 bgcolor=#E9E9E9
| 357279 ||  || — || September 19, 2002 || Palomar || NEAT || — || align=right | 2.9 km || 
|-id=280 bgcolor=#E9E9E9
| 357280 ||  || — || September 30, 2002 || Haleakala || NEAT || EUN || align=right | 1.7 km || 
|-id=281 bgcolor=#E9E9E9
| 357281 ||  || — || September 16, 2002 || Palomar || R. Matson || — || align=right | 1.1 km || 
|-id=282 bgcolor=#E9E9E9
| 357282 ||  || — || September 29, 2002 || Kvistaberg || UDAS || — || align=right | 3.4 km || 
|-id=283 bgcolor=#E9E9E9
| 357283 ||  || — || October 2, 2002 || Socorro || LINEAR || NEM || align=right | 2.8 km || 
|-id=284 bgcolor=#E9E9E9
| 357284 ||  || — || September 12, 2002 || Palomar || NEAT || — || align=right | 1.8 km || 
|-id=285 bgcolor=#E9E9E9
| 357285 ||  || — || October 4, 2002 || Socorro || LINEAR || — || align=right | 2.6 km || 
|-id=286 bgcolor=#E9E9E9
| 357286 ||  || — || October 5, 2002 || Palomar || NEAT || — || align=right | 1.5 km || 
|-id=287 bgcolor=#E9E9E9
| 357287 ||  || — || October 4, 2002 || Palomar || NEAT || BAR || align=right | 1.7 km || 
|-id=288 bgcolor=#E9E9E9
| 357288 ||  || — || October 4, 2002 || Socorro || LINEAR || EUN || align=right | 1.5 km || 
|-id=289 bgcolor=#E9E9E9
| 357289 ||  || — || October 6, 2002 || Socorro || LINEAR || — || align=right | 2.6 km || 
|-id=290 bgcolor=#E9E9E9
| 357290 ||  || — || September 5, 2002 || Apache Point || SDSS || JUN || align=right | 1.0 km || 
|-id=291 bgcolor=#E9E9E9
| 357291 ||  || — || October 5, 2002 || Apache Point || SDSS || — || align=right | 1.0 km || 
|-id=292 bgcolor=#E9E9E9
| 357292 ||  || — || October 31, 2002 || Socorro || LINEAR || — || align=right | 3.1 km || 
|-id=293 bgcolor=#E9E9E9
| 357293 ||  || — || September 13, 2002 || Palomar || NEAT || — || align=right | 2.4 km || 
|-id=294 bgcolor=#E9E9E9
| 357294 ||  || — || October 30, 2002 || Palomar || NEAT || — || align=right | 1.4 km || 
|-id=295 bgcolor=#E9E9E9
| 357295 ||  || — || November 2, 2002 || Haleakala || NEAT || — || align=right | 3.1 km || 
|-id=296 bgcolor=#E9E9E9
| 357296 ||  || — || November 5, 2002 || Socorro || LINEAR || — || align=right | 2.5 km || 
|-id=297 bgcolor=#E9E9E9
| 357297 ||  || — || November 6, 2002 || Haleakala || NEAT || — || align=right | 2.1 km || 
|-id=298 bgcolor=#E9E9E9
| 357298 ||  || — || November 7, 2002 || Socorro || LINEAR || — || align=right | 2.9 km || 
|-id=299 bgcolor=#E9E9E9
| 357299 ||  || — || October 30, 2002 || Haleakala || NEAT || — || align=right | 2.6 km || 
|-id=300 bgcolor=#E9E9E9
| 357300 ||  || — || November 13, 2002 || Kitt Peak || Spacewatch || — || align=right | 2.2 km || 
|}

357301–357400 

|-bgcolor=#fefefe
| 357301 ||  || — || October 6, 2005 || Mount Lemmon || Mount Lemmon Survey || — || align=right data-sort-value="0.51" | 510 m || 
|-id=302 bgcolor=#E9E9E9
| 357302 ||  || — || October 16, 2002 || Palomar || NEAT || — || align=right | 1.5 km || 
|-id=303 bgcolor=#E9E9E9
| 357303 ||  || — || November 16, 2002 || Palomar || NEAT || — || align=right | 1.9 km || 
|-id=304 bgcolor=#E9E9E9
| 357304 ||  || — || December 7, 2002 || Socorro || LINEAR || EUN || align=right | 1.7 km || 
|-id=305 bgcolor=#E9E9E9
| 357305 ||  || — || December 14, 2002 || Socorro || LINEAR || — || align=right | 2.5 km || 
|-id=306 bgcolor=#d6d6d6
| 357306 ||  || — || January 7, 2003 || Socorro || LINEAR || — || align=right | 2.9 km || 
|-id=307 bgcolor=#E9E9E9
| 357307 ||  || — || January 5, 2003 || Socorro || LINEAR || — || align=right | 3.6 km || 
|-id=308 bgcolor=#fefefe
| 357308 ||  || — || January 11, 2003 || Socorro || LINEAR || H || align=right data-sort-value="0.94" | 940 m || 
|-id=309 bgcolor=#d6d6d6
| 357309 ||  || — || January 28, 2003 || Socorro || LINEAR || FIR || align=right | 2.7 km || 
|-id=310 bgcolor=#E9E9E9
| 357310 ||  || — || February 3, 2003 || Socorro || LINEAR || — || align=right | 3.0 km || 
|-id=311 bgcolor=#FFC2E0
| 357311 ||  || — || February 26, 2003 || Socorro || LINEAR || AMO +1km || align=right | 1.9 km || 
|-id=312 bgcolor=#fefefe
| 357312 ||  || — || February 4, 2003 || Socorro || LINEAR || — || align=right | 1.1 km || 
|-id=313 bgcolor=#d6d6d6
| 357313 ||  || — || March 24, 2003 || Kitt Peak || Spacewatch || DUR || align=right | 3.8 km || 
|-id=314 bgcolor=#fefefe
| 357314 ||  || — || July 1, 1997 || Kitt Peak || Spacewatch || — || align=right | 1.1 km || 
|-id=315 bgcolor=#d6d6d6
| 357315 ||  || — || March 31, 2003 || Cerro Tololo || DLS || — || align=right | 2.9 km || 
|-id=316 bgcolor=#fefefe
| 357316 ||  || — || March 30, 2003 || Kitt Peak || M. W. Buie || — || align=right data-sort-value="0.92" | 920 m || 
|-id=317 bgcolor=#fefefe
| 357317 ||  || — || March 26, 2003 || Kitt Peak || Spacewatch || — || align=right data-sort-value="0.68" | 680 m || 
|-id=318 bgcolor=#d6d6d6
| 357318 ||  || — || March 31, 2003 || Anderson Mesa || LONEOS || — || align=right | 2.9 km || 
|-id=319 bgcolor=#FA8072
| 357319 ||  || — || April 1, 2003 || Socorro || LINEAR || — || align=right data-sort-value="0.96" | 960 m || 
|-id=320 bgcolor=#fefefe
| 357320 ||  || — || April 8, 2003 || Kitt Peak || Spacewatch || — || align=right data-sort-value="0.76" | 760 m || 
|-id=321 bgcolor=#d6d6d6
| 357321 ||  || — || April 4, 2003 || Kitt Peak || Spacewatch || — || align=right | 2.1 km || 
|-id=322 bgcolor=#fefefe
| 357322 ||  || — || April 24, 2003 || Kitt Peak || Spacewatch || FLO || align=right data-sort-value="0.74" | 740 m || 
|-id=323 bgcolor=#fefefe
| 357323 ||  || — || April 24, 2003 || Anderson Mesa || LONEOS || — || align=right data-sort-value="0.91" | 910 m || 
|-id=324 bgcolor=#d6d6d6
| 357324 ||  || — || April 28, 2003 || Kitt Peak || Spacewatch || — || align=right | 3.0 km || 
|-id=325 bgcolor=#d6d6d6
| 357325 ||  || — || May 1, 2003 || Kitt Peak || Spacewatch || — || align=right | 2.6 km || 
|-id=326 bgcolor=#d6d6d6
| 357326 ||  || — || May 6, 2003 || Kitt Peak || Spacewatch || — || align=right | 3.1 km || 
|-id=327 bgcolor=#fefefe
| 357327 ||  || — || May 27, 2003 || Kitt Peak || Spacewatch || H || align=right data-sort-value="0.75" | 750 m || 
|-id=328 bgcolor=#fefefe
| 357328 ||  || — || May 29, 2003 || Socorro || LINEAR || PHO || align=right | 1.4 km || 
|-id=329 bgcolor=#d6d6d6
| 357329 ||  || — || February 6, 2002 || Kitt Peak || Spacewatch || — || align=right | 3.3 km || 
|-id=330 bgcolor=#FA8072
| 357330 ||  || — || June 22, 2003 || Anderson Mesa || LONEOS || H || align=right data-sort-value="0.95" | 950 m || 
|-id=331 bgcolor=#d6d6d6
| 357331 ||  || — || July 5, 2003 || Socorro || LINEAR || Tj (2.99) || align=right | 3.5 km || 
|-id=332 bgcolor=#d6d6d6
| 357332 ||  || — || July 5, 2003 || Haleakala || NEAT || EUP || align=right | 3.6 km || 
|-id=333 bgcolor=#FA8072
| 357333 ||  || — || July 7, 2003 || Palomar || NEAT || — || align=right data-sort-value="0.87" | 870 m || 
|-id=334 bgcolor=#fefefe
| 357334 ||  || — || July 22, 2003 || Palomar || NEAT || PHO || align=right | 1.2 km || 
|-id=335 bgcolor=#fefefe
| 357335 ||  || — || July 22, 2003 || Palomar || NEAT || — || align=right | 1.4 km || 
|-id=336 bgcolor=#fefefe
| 357336 ||  || — || July 29, 2003 || Reedy Creek || J. Broughton || — || align=right data-sort-value="0.83" | 830 m || 
|-id=337 bgcolor=#d6d6d6
| 357337 ||  || — || July 24, 2003 || Palomar || NEAT || — || align=right | 3.9 km || 
|-id=338 bgcolor=#fefefe
| 357338 ||  || — || August 1, 2003 || Bergisch Gladbac || W. Bickel || — || align=right data-sort-value="0.94" | 940 m || 
|-id=339 bgcolor=#fefefe
| 357339 ||  || — || August 21, 2003 || Campo Imperatore || CINEOS || MAS || align=right data-sort-value="0.85" | 850 m || 
|-id=340 bgcolor=#fefefe
| 357340 ||  || — || August 22, 2003 || Palomar || NEAT || — || align=right | 1.3 km || 
|-id=341 bgcolor=#fefefe
| 357341 ||  || — || August 23, 2003 || Socorro || LINEAR || — || align=right | 1.0 km || 
|-id=342 bgcolor=#fefefe
| 357342 ||  || — || August 22, 2003 || Palomar || NEAT || — || align=right data-sort-value="0.91" | 910 m || 
|-id=343 bgcolor=#d6d6d6
| 357343 ||  || — || August 20, 2003 || Palomar || NEAT || EUP || align=right | 4.6 km || 
|-id=344 bgcolor=#fefefe
| 357344 ||  || — || August 23, 2003 || Socorro || LINEAR || H || align=right data-sort-value="0.86" | 860 m || 
|-id=345 bgcolor=#fefefe
| 357345 ||  || — || August 22, 2003 || Palomar || NEAT || KLI || align=right | 2.2 km || 
|-id=346 bgcolor=#fefefe
| 357346 ||  || — || August 22, 2003 || Socorro || LINEAR || — || align=right | 1.8 km || 
|-id=347 bgcolor=#fefefe
| 357347 ||  || — || August 22, 2003 || Haleakala || NEAT || — || align=right | 1.0 km || 
|-id=348 bgcolor=#fefefe
| 357348 ||  || — || August 23, 2003 || Palomar || NEAT || H || align=right data-sort-value="0.93" | 930 m || 
|-id=349 bgcolor=#d6d6d6
| 357349 ||  || — || August 23, 2003 || Palomar || NEAT || TIR || align=right | 3.6 km || 
|-id=350 bgcolor=#fefefe
| 357350 ||  || — || August 23, 2003 || Socorro || LINEAR || — || align=right | 2.2 km || 
|-id=351 bgcolor=#fefefe
| 357351 ||  || — || August 24, 2003 || Socorro || LINEAR || H || align=right data-sort-value="0.94" | 940 m || 
|-id=352 bgcolor=#fefefe
| 357352 ||  || — || August 29, 2003 || Haleakala || NEAT || — || align=right data-sort-value="0.98" | 980 m || 
|-id=353 bgcolor=#fefefe
| 357353 ||  || — || August 30, 2003 || Haleakala || NEAT || — || align=right | 1.1 km || 
|-id=354 bgcolor=#fefefe
| 357354 ||  || — || August 25, 2003 || Socorro || LINEAR || V || align=right data-sort-value="0.87" | 870 m || 
|-id=355 bgcolor=#FA8072
| 357355 ||  || — || September 7, 2003 || Socorro || LINEAR || — || align=right | 1.3 km || 
|-id=356 bgcolor=#fefefe
| 357356 ||  || — || September 15, 2003 || Palomar || NEAT || ERI || align=right | 1.6 km || 
|-id=357 bgcolor=#fefefe
| 357357 ||  || — || September 15, 2003 || Palomar || NEAT || H || align=right data-sort-value="0.85" | 850 m || 
|-id=358 bgcolor=#fefefe
| 357358 ||  || — || September 16, 2003 || Kitt Peak || Spacewatch || V || align=right | 1.0 km || 
|-id=359 bgcolor=#E9E9E9
| 357359 ||  || — || September 17, 2003 || Kitt Peak || Spacewatch || — || align=right data-sort-value="0.81" | 810 m || 
|-id=360 bgcolor=#fefefe
| 357360 ||  || — || September 17, 2003 || Kitt Peak || Spacewatch || — || align=right | 1.0 km || 
|-id=361 bgcolor=#E9E9E9
| 357361 ||  || — || September 18, 2003 || Palomar || NEAT || — || align=right | 1.2 km || 
|-id=362 bgcolor=#fefefe
| 357362 ||  || — || September 16, 2003 || Anderson Mesa || LONEOS || V || align=right data-sort-value="0.76" | 760 m || 
|-id=363 bgcolor=#E9E9E9
| 357363 ||  || — || September 20, 2003 || Palomar || NEAT || — || align=right | 2.6 km || 
|-id=364 bgcolor=#fefefe
| 357364 ||  || — || September 20, 2003 || Palomar || NEAT || — || align=right | 1.0 km || 
|-id=365 bgcolor=#d6d6d6
| 357365 ||  || — || September 22, 2003 || Reedy Creek || J. Broughton || — || align=right | 3.8 km || 
|-id=366 bgcolor=#fefefe
| 357366 ||  || — || September 20, 2003 || Anderson Mesa || LONEOS || H || align=right data-sort-value="0.67" | 670 m || 
|-id=367 bgcolor=#fefefe
| 357367 ||  || — || September 20, 2003 || Anderson Mesa || LONEOS || — || align=right | 1.2 km || 
|-id=368 bgcolor=#fefefe
| 357368 ||  || — || September 22, 2003 || Socorro || LINEAR || — || align=right | 1.3 km || 
|-id=369 bgcolor=#d6d6d6
| 357369 ||  || — || September 20, 2003 || Kitt Peak || Spacewatch || — || align=right | 3.5 km || 
|-id=370 bgcolor=#fefefe
| 357370 ||  || — || September 21, 2003 || Kitt Peak || Spacewatch || MAS || align=right data-sort-value="0.80" | 800 m || 
|-id=371 bgcolor=#fefefe
| 357371 ||  || — || September 20, 2003 || Palomar || NEAT || — || align=right | 1.2 km || 
|-id=372 bgcolor=#FA8072
| 357372 ||  || — || April 12, 2002 || Palomar || NEAT || H || align=right data-sort-value="0.77" | 770 m || 
|-id=373 bgcolor=#fefefe
| 357373 ||  || — || September 26, 2003 || Socorro || LINEAR || NYS || align=right data-sort-value="0.76" | 760 m || 
|-id=374 bgcolor=#fefefe
| 357374 ||  || — || September 25, 2003 || Palomar || NEAT || — || align=right | 1.2 km || 
|-id=375 bgcolor=#E9E9E9
| 357375 ||  || — || September 28, 2003 || Socorro || LINEAR || — || align=right | 1.2 km || 
|-id=376 bgcolor=#fefefe
| 357376 ||  || — || September 30, 2003 || Socorro || LINEAR || — || align=right | 1.1 km || 
|-id=377 bgcolor=#fefefe
| 357377 ||  || — || September 29, 2003 || Kitt Peak || Spacewatch || — || align=right data-sort-value="0.91" | 910 m || 
|-id=378 bgcolor=#fefefe
| 357378 ||  || — || September 20, 2003 || Kitt Peak || Spacewatch || — || align=right data-sort-value="0.94" | 940 m || 
|-id=379 bgcolor=#fefefe
| 357379 ||  || — || October 2, 2003 || Kitt Peak || Spacewatch || V || align=right data-sort-value="0.89" | 890 m || 
|-id=380 bgcolor=#fefefe
| 357380 ||  || — || October 3, 2003 || Kitt Peak || Spacewatch || SUL || align=right | 1.8 km || 
|-id=381 bgcolor=#fefefe
| 357381 ||  || — || October 16, 2003 || Kitt Peak || Spacewatch || — || align=right data-sort-value="0.90" | 900 m || 
|-id=382 bgcolor=#E9E9E9
| 357382 ||  || — || October 23, 2003 || Anderson Mesa || LONEOS || — || align=right | 2.7 km || 
|-id=383 bgcolor=#fefefe
| 357383 ||  || — || October 17, 2003 || Kitt Peak || Spacewatch || MAS || align=right data-sort-value="0.86" | 860 m || 
|-id=384 bgcolor=#fefefe
| 357384 ||  || — || October 17, 2003 || Kitt Peak || Spacewatch || MAS || align=right data-sort-value="0.76" | 760 m || 
|-id=385 bgcolor=#E9E9E9
| 357385 ||  || — || October 16, 2003 || Anderson Mesa || LONEOS || — || align=right | 1.1 km || 
|-id=386 bgcolor=#E9E9E9
| 357386 ||  || — || October 16, 2003 || Palomar || NEAT || — || align=right | 1.8 km || 
|-id=387 bgcolor=#E9E9E9
| 357387 ||  || — || October 16, 2003 || Palomar || NEAT || — || align=right | 1.1 km || 
|-id=388 bgcolor=#E9E9E9
| 357388 ||  || — || October 17, 2003 || Anderson Mesa || LONEOS || — || align=right | 1.2 km || 
|-id=389 bgcolor=#E9E9E9
| 357389 ||  || — || October 16, 2003 || Anderson Mesa || LONEOS || — || align=right | 1.3 km || 
|-id=390 bgcolor=#E9E9E9
| 357390 ||  || — || October 20, 2003 || Palomar || NEAT || — || align=right | 1.1 km || 
|-id=391 bgcolor=#fefefe
| 357391 ||  || — || October 20, 2003 || Socorro || LINEAR || — || align=right | 1.1 km || 
|-id=392 bgcolor=#E9E9E9
| 357392 ||  || — || October 18, 2003 || Anderson Mesa || LONEOS || — || align=right | 1.5 km || 
|-id=393 bgcolor=#E9E9E9
| 357393 ||  || — || October 20, 2003 || Socorro || LINEAR || — || align=right data-sort-value="0.91" | 910 m || 
|-id=394 bgcolor=#E9E9E9
| 357394 ||  || — || October 21, 2003 || Socorro || LINEAR || — || align=right | 2.1 km || 
|-id=395 bgcolor=#fefefe
| 357395 ||  || — || October 20, 2003 || Kitt Peak || Spacewatch || MAS || align=right | 1.0 km || 
|-id=396 bgcolor=#E9E9E9
| 357396 ||  || — || October 23, 2003 || Kitt Peak || Spacewatch || — || align=right data-sort-value="0.79" | 790 m || 
|-id=397 bgcolor=#E9E9E9
| 357397 ||  || — || October 21, 2003 || Palomar || NEAT || — || align=right data-sort-value="0.95" | 950 m || 
|-id=398 bgcolor=#E9E9E9
| 357398 ||  || — || October 23, 2003 || Anderson Mesa || LONEOS || — || align=right | 1.2 km || 
|-id=399 bgcolor=#fefefe
| 357399 ||  || — || October 24, 2003 || Kitt Peak || Spacewatch || — || align=right | 1.1 km || 
|-id=400 bgcolor=#fefefe
| 357400 ||  || — || October 24, 2003 || Kitt Peak || Spacewatch || V || align=right data-sort-value="0.89" | 890 m || 
|}

357401–357500 

|-bgcolor=#E9E9E9
| 357401 ||  || — || October 24, 2003 || Haleakala || NEAT || — || align=right | 1.4 km || 
|-id=402 bgcolor=#fefefe
| 357402 ||  || — || October 25, 2003 || Socorro || LINEAR || — || align=right | 1.1 km || 
|-id=403 bgcolor=#fefefe
| 357403 ||  || — || October 23, 2003 || Kitt Peak || Spacewatch || — || align=right | 1.0 km || 
|-id=404 bgcolor=#fefefe
| 357404 ||  || — || October 19, 2003 || Apache Point || SDSS || — || align=right | 1.3 km || 
|-id=405 bgcolor=#fefefe
| 357405 ||  || — || October 22, 2003 || Apache Point || SDSS || — || align=right data-sort-value="0.85" | 850 m || 
|-id=406 bgcolor=#FA8072
| 357406 ||  || — || November 15, 2003 || Kitt Peak || Spacewatch || — || align=right data-sort-value="0.39" | 390 m || 
|-id=407 bgcolor=#E9E9E9
| 357407 ||  || — || November 16, 2003 || Socorro || LINEAR || — || align=right | 5.4 km || 
|-id=408 bgcolor=#E9E9E9
| 357408 ||  || — || November 16, 2003 || Kitt Peak || Spacewatch || — || align=right | 1.4 km || 
|-id=409 bgcolor=#E9E9E9
| 357409 ||  || — || November 20, 2003 || Kitt Peak || Spacewatch || — || align=right | 1.4 km || 
|-id=410 bgcolor=#E9E9E9
| 357410 ||  || — || November 24, 2003 || Kitt Peak || Spacewatch || — || align=right data-sort-value="0.87" | 870 m || 
|-id=411 bgcolor=#E9E9E9
| 357411 ||  || — || November 20, 2003 || Socorro || LINEAR || — || align=right | 1.9 km || 
|-id=412 bgcolor=#E9E9E9
| 357412 ||  || — || November 30, 2003 || Catalina || CSS || IAN || align=right | 1.5 km || 
|-id=413 bgcolor=#E9E9E9
| 357413 ||  || — || November 24, 2003 || Socorro || LINEAR || — || align=right | 1.9 km || 
|-id=414 bgcolor=#FFC2E0
| 357414 ||  || — || December 1, 2003 || Socorro || LINEAR || AMO || align=right data-sort-value="0.77" | 770 m || 
|-id=415 bgcolor=#E9E9E9
| 357415 ||  || — || December 1, 2003 || Catalina || CSS || — || align=right | 2.0 km || 
|-id=416 bgcolor=#E9E9E9
| 357416 ||  || — || December 4, 2003 || Socorro || LINEAR || — || align=right | 2.1 km || 
|-id=417 bgcolor=#E9E9E9
| 357417 ||  || — || December 14, 2003 || Palomar || NEAT || — || align=right | 1.6 km || 
|-id=418 bgcolor=#d6d6d6
| 357418 ||  || — || December 14, 2003 || Kitt Peak || Spacewatch || LIX || align=right | 4.3 km || 
|-id=419 bgcolor=#E9E9E9
| 357419 ||  || — || November 19, 2003 || Socorro || LINEAR || BRG || align=right | 2.0 km || 
|-id=420 bgcolor=#E9E9E9
| 357420 ||  || — || December 17, 2003 || Kitt Peak || Spacewatch || — || align=right | 1.7 km || 
|-id=421 bgcolor=#E9E9E9
| 357421 ||  || — || December 17, 2003 || Kitt Peak || Spacewatch || — || align=right | 1.2 km || 
|-id=422 bgcolor=#E9E9E9
| 357422 ||  || — || December 19, 2003 || Socorro || LINEAR || — || align=right | 1.1 km || 
|-id=423 bgcolor=#E9E9E9
| 357423 ||  || — || December 19, 2003 || Kitt Peak || Spacewatch || — || align=right | 1.5 km || 
|-id=424 bgcolor=#E9E9E9
| 357424 ||  || — || December 20, 2003 || Socorro || LINEAR || — || align=right | 1.4 km || 
|-id=425 bgcolor=#E9E9E9
| 357425 ||  || — || December 18, 2003 || Socorro || LINEAR || — || align=right | 1.8 km || 
|-id=426 bgcolor=#E9E9E9
| 357426 ||  || — || December 19, 2003 || Socorro || LINEAR || — || align=right | 1.7 km || 
|-id=427 bgcolor=#E9E9E9
| 357427 ||  || — || December 27, 2003 || Socorro || LINEAR || — || align=right | 3.7 km || 
|-id=428 bgcolor=#E9E9E9
| 357428 ||  || — || December 27, 2003 || Socorro || LINEAR || — || align=right | 2.0 km || 
|-id=429 bgcolor=#E9E9E9
| 357429 ||  || — || December 28, 2003 || Socorro || LINEAR || — || align=right | 2.2 km || 
|-id=430 bgcolor=#FA8072
| 357430 ||  || — || December 28, 2003 || Socorro || LINEAR || — || align=right | 2.4 km || 
|-id=431 bgcolor=#E9E9E9
| 357431 ||  || — || December 27, 2003 || Socorro || LINEAR || — || align=right | 3.5 km || 
|-id=432 bgcolor=#E9E9E9
| 357432 ||  || — || December 28, 2003 || Socorro || LINEAR || EUN || align=right | 1.6 km || 
|-id=433 bgcolor=#E9E9E9
| 357433 ||  || — || December 28, 2003 || Socorro || LINEAR || — || align=right | 2.1 km || 
|-id=434 bgcolor=#E9E9E9
| 357434 ||  || — || January 15, 2004 || Kitt Peak || Spacewatch || — || align=right | 1.1 km || 
|-id=435 bgcolor=#E9E9E9
| 357435 ||  || — || January 15, 2004 || Kitt Peak || Spacewatch || — || align=right | 1.0 km || 
|-id=436 bgcolor=#E9E9E9
| 357436 ||  || — || January 21, 2004 || Socorro || LINEAR || ADE || align=right | 4.2 km || 
|-id=437 bgcolor=#E9E9E9
| 357437 ||  || — || January 21, 2004 || Socorro || LINEAR || BAR || align=right | 2.0 km || 
|-id=438 bgcolor=#E9E9E9
| 357438 ||  || — || January 23, 2004 || Socorro || LINEAR || — || align=right | 2.4 km || 
|-id=439 bgcolor=#FFC2E0
| 357439 ||  || — || January 30, 2004 || Socorro || LINEAR || APOPHAmoon || align=right data-sort-value="0.48" | 480 m || 
|-id=440 bgcolor=#E9E9E9
| 357440 ||  || — || January 23, 2004 || Socorro || LINEAR || — || align=right | 1.5 km || 
|-id=441 bgcolor=#E9E9E9
| 357441 ||  || — || January 27, 2004 || Kitt Peak || Spacewatch || — || align=right | 1.8 km || 
|-id=442 bgcolor=#E9E9E9
| 357442 ||  || — || January 30, 2004 || Catalina || CSS || — || align=right | 2.5 km || 
|-id=443 bgcolor=#E9E9E9
| 357443 ||  || — || January 18, 2004 || Kitt Peak || Spacewatch || — || align=right | 1.6 km || 
|-id=444 bgcolor=#E9E9E9
| 357444 ||  || — || January 19, 2004 || Kitt Peak || Spacewatch || — || align=right | 1.5 km || 
|-id=445 bgcolor=#E9E9E9
| 357445 ||  || — || February 11, 2004 || Kitt Peak || Spacewatch || — || align=right | 1.2 km || 
|-id=446 bgcolor=#E9E9E9
| 357446 ||  || — || February 12, 2004 || Desert Eagle || W. K. Y. Yeung || — || align=right | 2.6 km || 
|-id=447 bgcolor=#E9E9E9
| 357447 ||  || — || February 10, 2004 || Palomar || NEAT || — || align=right | 1.9 km || 
|-id=448 bgcolor=#E9E9E9
| 357448 ||  || — || February 10, 2004 || Palomar || NEAT || — || align=right | 2.5 km || 
|-id=449 bgcolor=#E9E9E9
| 357449 ||  || — || February 11, 2004 || Kitt Peak || Spacewatch || — || align=right | 1.7 km || 
|-id=450 bgcolor=#E9E9E9
| 357450 ||  || — || February 13, 2004 || Kitt Peak || Spacewatch || — || align=right | 2.7 km || 
|-id=451 bgcolor=#E9E9E9
| 357451 ||  || — || February 12, 2004 || Kitt Peak || Spacewatch || — || align=right | 2.8 km || 
|-id=452 bgcolor=#E9E9E9
| 357452 ||  || — || February 14, 2004 || Palomar || NEAT || JUN || align=right | 1.5 km || 
|-id=453 bgcolor=#E9E9E9
| 357453 ||  || — || February 17, 2004 || Kitt Peak || Spacewatch || — || align=right | 2.0 km || 
|-id=454 bgcolor=#E9E9E9
| 357454 ||  || — || January 29, 2004 || Socorro || LINEAR || — || align=right | 2.4 km || 
|-id=455 bgcolor=#E9E9E9
| 357455 ||  || — || February 13, 2004 || Kitt Peak || Spacewatch || — || align=right | 1.8 km || 
|-id=456 bgcolor=#E9E9E9
| 357456 ||  || — || February 23, 2004 || Socorro || LINEAR || — || align=right | 2.8 km || 
|-id=457 bgcolor=#E9E9E9
| 357457 ||  || — || March 12, 2004 || Palomar || NEAT || — || align=right | 2.0 km || 
|-id=458 bgcolor=#E9E9E9
| 357458 ||  || — || March 12, 2004 || Palomar || NEAT || DOR || align=right | 3.0 km || 
|-id=459 bgcolor=#E9E9E9
| 357459 ||  || — || March 14, 2004 || Socorro || LINEAR || — || align=right | 1.9 km || 
|-id=460 bgcolor=#E9E9E9
| 357460 ||  || — || March 15, 2004 || Socorro || LINEAR || JUN || align=right | 1.5 km || 
|-id=461 bgcolor=#E9E9E9
| 357461 ||  || — || March 15, 2004 || Socorro || LINEAR || — || align=right | 2.5 km || 
|-id=462 bgcolor=#E9E9E9
| 357462 ||  || — || March 14, 2004 || Socorro || LINEAR || — || align=right | 2.1 km || 
|-id=463 bgcolor=#E9E9E9
| 357463 ||  || — || March 15, 2004 || Socorro || LINEAR || — || align=right | 2.3 km || 
|-id=464 bgcolor=#E9E9E9
| 357464 ||  || — || March 14, 2004 || Kitt Peak || Spacewatch || EUN || align=right | 1.9 km || 
|-id=465 bgcolor=#E9E9E9
| 357465 ||  || — || March 14, 2004 || Kitt Peak || Spacewatch || — || align=right | 1.9 km || 
|-id=466 bgcolor=#E9E9E9
| 357466 ||  || — || March 15, 2004 || Kitt Peak || Spacewatch || — || align=right | 2.5 km || 
|-id=467 bgcolor=#E9E9E9
| 357467 ||  || — || March 1, 2004 || Socorro || LINEAR || — || align=right | 3.4 km || 
|-id=468 bgcolor=#E9E9E9
| 357468 ||  || — || March 15, 2004 || Socorro || LINEAR || — || align=right | 3.1 km || 
|-id=469 bgcolor=#E9E9E9
| 357469 ||  || — || March 27, 2004 || Socorro || LINEAR || — || align=right | 3.5 km || 
|-id=470 bgcolor=#E9E9E9
| 357470 ||  || — || March 18, 2004 || Socorro || LINEAR || EUN || align=right | 1.3 km || 
|-id=471 bgcolor=#E9E9E9
| 357471 ||  || — || February 29, 2004 || Kitt Peak || Spacewatch || HOF || align=right | 2.8 km || 
|-id=472 bgcolor=#E9E9E9
| 357472 ||  || — || March 17, 2004 || Kitt Peak || Spacewatch || MRX || align=right data-sort-value="0.91" | 910 m || 
|-id=473 bgcolor=#E9E9E9
| 357473 ||  || — || March 18, 2004 || Kitt Peak || Spacewatch || GEF || align=right | 1.6 km || 
|-id=474 bgcolor=#E9E9E9
| 357474 ||  || — || March 19, 2004 || Palomar || NEAT || — || align=right | 2.2 km || 
|-id=475 bgcolor=#E9E9E9
| 357475 ||  || — || March 19, 2004 || Palomar || NEAT || JUN || align=right | 1.3 km || 
|-id=476 bgcolor=#E9E9E9
| 357476 ||  || — || March 23, 2004 || Kitt Peak || Spacewatch || — || align=right | 2.8 km || 
|-id=477 bgcolor=#E9E9E9
| 357477 ||  || — || March 16, 2004 || Kitt Peak || Spacewatch || — || align=right | 3.2 km || 
|-id=478 bgcolor=#E9E9E9
| 357478 ||  || — || March 22, 2004 || Anderson Mesa || LONEOS || — || align=right | 3.4 km || 
|-id=479 bgcolor=#E9E9E9
| 357479 ||  || — || April 9, 2004 || Siding Spring || SSS || — || align=right | 3.4 km || 
|-id=480 bgcolor=#E9E9E9
| 357480 ||  || — || April 12, 2004 || Anderson Mesa || LONEOS || — || align=right | 2.6 km || 
|-id=481 bgcolor=#E9E9E9
| 357481 ||  || — || April 12, 2004 || Kitt Peak || Spacewatch || — || align=right | 1.8 km || 
|-id=482 bgcolor=#E9E9E9
| 357482 ||  || — || April 16, 2004 || Socorro || LINEAR || — || align=right | 2.5 km || 
|-id=483 bgcolor=#E9E9E9
| 357483 ||  || — || April 19, 2004 || Socorro || LINEAR || — || align=right | 1.8 km || 
|-id=484 bgcolor=#E9E9E9
| 357484 ||  || — || April 21, 2004 || Catalina || CSS || — || align=right | 2.8 km || 
|-id=485 bgcolor=#E9E9E9
| 357485 ||  || — || May 15, 2004 || Socorro || LINEAR || — || align=right | 2.8 km || 
|-id=486 bgcolor=#E9E9E9
| 357486 ||  || — || May 12, 2004 || Anderson Mesa || LONEOS || — || align=right | 2.9 km || 
|-id=487 bgcolor=#d6d6d6
| 357487 ||  || — || May 14, 2004 || Kitt Peak || Spacewatch || — || align=right | 4.6 km || 
|-id=488 bgcolor=#E9E9E9
| 357488 ||  || — || May 13, 2004 || Kitt Peak || Spacewatch || AGN || align=right | 1.2 km || 
|-id=489 bgcolor=#E9E9E9
| 357489 ||  || — || May 16, 2004 || Campo Imperatore || CINEOS || — || align=right | 3.1 km || 
|-id=490 bgcolor=#E9E9E9
| 357490 ||  || — || May 19, 2004 || Socorro || LINEAR || — || align=right | 2.4 km || 
|-id=491 bgcolor=#d6d6d6
| 357491 ||  || — || June 13, 2004 || Kitt Peak || Spacewatch || — || align=right | 2.6 km || 
|-id=492 bgcolor=#fefefe
| 357492 ||  || — || July 14, 2004 || Socorro || LINEAR || — || align=right data-sort-value="0.77" | 770 m || 
|-id=493 bgcolor=#d6d6d6
| 357493 ||  || — || July 14, 2004 || Socorro || LINEAR || — || align=right | 3.6 km || 
|-id=494 bgcolor=#d6d6d6
| 357494 ||  || — || July 22, 2004 || Anderson Mesa || LONEOS || — || align=right | 3.7 km || 
|-id=495 bgcolor=#d6d6d6
| 357495 ||  || — || August 7, 2004 || Palomar || NEAT || — || align=right | 5.1 km || 
|-id=496 bgcolor=#fefefe
| 357496 ||  || — || August 8, 2004 || Campo Imperatore || CINEOS || — || align=right data-sort-value="0.86" | 860 m || 
|-id=497 bgcolor=#d6d6d6
| 357497 ||  || — || August 8, 2004 || Socorro || LINEAR || EOS || align=right | 2.4 km || 
|-id=498 bgcolor=#fefefe
| 357498 ||  || — || August 9, 2004 || Socorro || LINEAR || — || align=right | 1.9 km || 
|-id=499 bgcolor=#d6d6d6
| 357499 ||  || — || August 9, 2004 || Socorro || LINEAR || — || align=right | 4.3 km || 
|-id=500 bgcolor=#fefefe
| 357500 ||  || — || August 10, 2004 || Socorro || LINEAR || FLO || align=right data-sort-value="0.69" | 690 m || 
|}

357501–357600 

|-bgcolor=#d6d6d6
| 357501 ||  || — || August 10, 2004 || Socorro || LINEAR || — || align=right | 4.2 km || 
|-id=502 bgcolor=#fefefe
| 357502 ||  || — || August 10, 2004 || Anderson Mesa || LONEOS || — || align=right data-sort-value="0.80" | 800 m || 
|-id=503 bgcolor=#d6d6d6
| 357503 ||  || — || August 11, 2004 || Socorro || LINEAR || — || align=right | 3.4 km || 
|-id=504 bgcolor=#fefefe
| 357504 ||  || — || August 8, 2004 || Socorro || LINEAR || FLO || align=right data-sort-value="0.76" | 760 m || 
|-id=505 bgcolor=#d6d6d6
| 357505 ||  || — || August 15, 2004 || Palomar || NEAT || — || align=right | 4.8 km || 
|-id=506 bgcolor=#fefefe
| 357506 ||  || — || August 12, 2004 || Socorro || LINEAR || FLO || align=right data-sort-value="0.76" | 760 m || 
|-id=507 bgcolor=#d6d6d6
| 357507 ||  || — || August 12, 2004 || Palomar || NEAT || — || align=right | 4.1 km || 
|-id=508 bgcolor=#fefefe
| 357508 ||  || — || August 22, 2004 || Bergisch Gladbac || W. Bickel || — || align=right data-sort-value="0.69" | 690 m || 
|-id=509 bgcolor=#fefefe
| 357509 ||  || — || September 5, 2004 || Bergisch Gladbac || W. Bickel || — || align=right data-sort-value="0.89" | 890 m || 
|-id=510 bgcolor=#FA8072
| 357510 ||  || — || September 7, 2004 || Kitt Peak || Spacewatch || — || align=right data-sort-value="0.77" | 770 m || 
|-id=511 bgcolor=#d6d6d6
| 357511 ||  || — || September 6, 2004 || Siding Spring || SSS || EUP || align=right | 4.1 km || 
|-id=512 bgcolor=#fefefe
| 357512 ||  || — || September 7, 2004 || Socorro || LINEAR || — || align=right data-sort-value="0.80" | 800 m || 
|-id=513 bgcolor=#d6d6d6
| 357513 ||  || — || September 6, 2004 || Palomar || NEAT || 637 || align=right | 2.7 km || 
|-id=514 bgcolor=#d6d6d6
| 357514 ||  || — || September 8, 2004 || Socorro || LINEAR || ALA || align=right | 4.1 km || 
|-id=515 bgcolor=#d6d6d6
| 357515 ||  || — || September 8, 2004 || Socorro || LINEAR || — || align=right | 3.4 km || 
|-id=516 bgcolor=#fefefe
| 357516 ||  || — || September 9, 2004 || Socorro || LINEAR || — || align=right data-sort-value="0.81" | 810 m || 
|-id=517 bgcolor=#fefefe
| 357517 ||  || — || September 6, 2004 || Siding Spring || SSS || — || align=right | 1.0 km || 
|-id=518 bgcolor=#d6d6d6
| 357518 ||  || — || September 8, 2004 || Socorro || LINEAR || — || align=right | 3.9 km || 
|-id=519 bgcolor=#d6d6d6
| 357519 ||  || — || September 8, 2004 || Socorro || LINEAR || — || align=right | 3.8 km || 
|-id=520 bgcolor=#d6d6d6
| 357520 ||  || — || September 8, 2004 || Palomar || NEAT || LIX || align=right | 4.1 km || 
|-id=521 bgcolor=#fefefe
| 357521 ||  || — || September 8, 2004 || Palomar || NEAT || V || align=right data-sort-value="0.73" | 730 m || 
|-id=522 bgcolor=#fefefe
| 357522 ||  || — || August 26, 2004 || Anderson Mesa || LONEOS || PHO || align=right | 1.3 km || 
|-id=523 bgcolor=#fefefe
| 357523 ||  || — || September 7, 2004 || Socorro || LINEAR || NYS || align=right data-sort-value="0.72" | 720 m || 
|-id=524 bgcolor=#fefefe
| 357524 ||  || — || September 8, 2004 || Socorro || LINEAR || — || align=right data-sort-value="0.81" | 810 m || 
|-id=525 bgcolor=#d6d6d6
| 357525 ||  || — || September 8, 2004 || Socorro || LINEAR || — || align=right | 3.9 km || 
|-id=526 bgcolor=#fefefe
| 357526 ||  || — || September 8, 2004 || Socorro || LINEAR || — || align=right data-sort-value="0.77" | 770 m || 
|-id=527 bgcolor=#fefefe
| 357527 ||  || — || September 8, 2004 || Socorro || LINEAR || FLO || align=right data-sort-value="0.83" | 830 m || 
|-id=528 bgcolor=#fefefe
| 357528 ||  || — || August 22, 2004 || Kitt Peak || Spacewatch || — || align=right data-sort-value="0.80" | 800 m || 
|-id=529 bgcolor=#d6d6d6
| 357529 ||  || — || September 11, 2004 || Kitt Peak || Spacewatch || URS || align=right | 3.0 km || 
|-id=530 bgcolor=#fefefe
| 357530 ||  || — || September 7, 2004 || Socorro || LINEAR || FLO || align=right data-sort-value="0.77" | 770 m || 
|-id=531 bgcolor=#d6d6d6
| 357531 ||  || — || September 9, 2004 || Kitt Peak || Spacewatch || EOS || align=right | 2.2 km || 
|-id=532 bgcolor=#d6d6d6
| 357532 ||  || — || September 10, 2004 || Socorro || LINEAR || — || align=right | 3.1 km || 
|-id=533 bgcolor=#d6d6d6
| 357533 ||  || — || September 10, 2004 || Socorro || LINEAR || — || align=right | 4.8 km || 
|-id=534 bgcolor=#fefefe
| 357534 ||  || — || September 10, 2004 || Socorro || LINEAR || V || align=right data-sort-value="0.65" | 650 m || 
|-id=535 bgcolor=#d6d6d6
| 357535 ||  || — || September 10, 2004 || Socorro || LINEAR || — || align=right | 5.9 km || 
|-id=536 bgcolor=#d6d6d6
| 357536 ||  || — || September 11, 2004 || Kitt Peak || Spacewatch || — || align=right | 2.7 km || 
|-id=537 bgcolor=#d6d6d6
| 357537 ||  || — || September 10, 2004 || Kitt Peak || Spacewatch || — || align=right | 3.0 km || 
|-id=538 bgcolor=#d6d6d6
| 357538 ||  || — || September 10, 2004 || Kitt Peak || Spacewatch || — || align=right | 3.1 km || 
|-id=539 bgcolor=#fefefe
| 357539 ||  || — || September 8, 2004 || Socorro || LINEAR || NYS || align=right data-sort-value="0.70" | 700 m || 
|-id=540 bgcolor=#fefefe
| 357540 ||  || — || September 11, 2004 || Kitt Peak || Spacewatch || — || align=right data-sort-value="0.69" | 690 m || 
|-id=541 bgcolor=#d6d6d6
| 357541 ||  || — || September 15, 2004 || Kitt Peak || Spacewatch || — || align=right | 3.9 km || 
|-id=542 bgcolor=#d6d6d6
| 357542 ||  || — || September 11, 2004 || Kitt Peak || Spacewatch || — || align=right | 4.6 km || 
|-id=543 bgcolor=#fefefe
| 357543 ||  || — || August 22, 2004 || Kitt Peak || Spacewatch || FLO || align=right data-sort-value="0.72" | 720 m || 
|-id=544 bgcolor=#fefefe
| 357544 ||  || — || September 13, 2004 || Socorro || LINEAR || FLO || align=right data-sort-value="0.74" | 740 m || 
|-id=545 bgcolor=#fefefe
| 357545 ||  || — || September 13, 2004 || Socorro || LINEAR || FLO || align=right data-sort-value="0.74" | 740 m || 
|-id=546 bgcolor=#d6d6d6
| 357546 Edwardhalbach ||  ||  || September 15, 2004 || Sonoita || W. R. Cooney Jr., J. Gross || EOS || align=right | 2.3 km || 
|-id=547 bgcolor=#d6d6d6
| 357547 ||  || — || September 17, 2004 || Desert Eagle || W. K. Y. Yeung || — || align=right | 3.9 km || 
|-id=548 bgcolor=#fefefe
| 357548 ||  || — || September 17, 2004 || Socorro || LINEAR || NYS || align=right data-sort-value="0.75" | 750 m || 
|-id=549 bgcolor=#d6d6d6
| 357549 ||  || — || September 17, 2004 || Kitt Peak || Spacewatch || — || align=right | 2.9 km || 
|-id=550 bgcolor=#d6d6d6
| 357550 ||  || — || September 18, 2004 || Socorro || LINEAR || — || align=right | 3.7 km || 
|-id=551 bgcolor=#fefefe
| 357551 ||  || — || September 18, 2004 || Socorro || LINEAR || — || align=right data-sort-value="0.90" | 900 m || 
|-id=552 bgcolor=#fefefe
| 357552 ||  || — || September 10, 2004 || Socorro || LINEAR || — || align=right data-sort-value="0.93" | 930 m || 
|-id=553 bgcolor=#d6d6d6
| 357553 ||  || — || September 22, 2004 || Socorro || LINEAR || — || align=right | 5.0 km || 
|-id=554 bgcolor=#FA8072
| 357554 ||  || — || September 18, 2004 || Siding Spring || SSS || H || align=right data-sort-value="0.92" | 920 m || 
|-id=555 bgcolor=#d6d6d6
| 357555 ||  || — || September 18, 2004 || Socorro || LINEAR || URS || align=right | 3.9 km || 
|-id=556 bgcolor=#fefefe
| 357556 ||  || — || October 4, 2004 || Kitt Peak || Spacewatch || — || align=right | 1.00 km || 
|-id=557 bgcolor=#fefefe
| 357557 ||  || — || October 4, 2004 || Kitt Peak || Spacewatch || FLO || align=right data-sort-value="0.58" | 580 m || 
|-id=558 bgcolor=#d6d6d6
| 357558 ||  || — || September 22, 2004 || Kitt Peak || Spacewatch || — || align=right | 3.7 km || 
|-id=559 bgcolor=#fefefe
| 357559 ||  || — || October 4, 2004 || Kitt Peak || Spacewatch || NYS || align=right data-sort-value="0.60" | 600 m || 
|-id=560 bgcolor=#fefefe
| 357560 ||  || — || October 4, 2004 || Kitt Peak || Spacewatch || — || align=right | 1.1 km || 
|-id=561 bgcolor=#fefefe
| 357561 ||  || — || October 4, 2004 || Kitt Peak || Spacewatch || — || align=right data-sort-value="0.83" | 830 m || 
|-id=562 bgcolor=#d6d6d6
| 357562 ||  || — || October 5, 2004 || Kitt Peak || Spacewatch || — || align=right | 3.2 km || 
|-id=563 bgcolor=#fefefe
| 357563 ||  || — || September 9, 2004 || Socorro || LINEAR || — || align=right data-sort-value="0.97" | 970 m || 
|-id=564 bgcolor=#d6d6d6
| 357564 ||  || — || September 24, 2004 || Kitt Peak || Spacewatch || — || align=right | 2.7 km || 
|-id=565 bgcolor=#fefefe
| 357565 ||  || — || October 5, 2004 || Kitt Peak || Spacewatch || FLO || align=right data-sort-value="0.56" | 560 m || 
|-id=566 bgcolor=#fefefe
| 357566 ||  || — || October 5, 2004 || Kitt Peak || Spacewatch || — || align=right data-sort-value="0.91" | 910 m || 
|-id=567 bgcolor=#fefefe
| 357567 ||  || — || September 17, 2004 || Kitt Peak || Spacewatch || FLO || align=right data-sort-value="0.69" | 690 m || 
|-id=568 bgcolor=#fefefe
| 357568 ||  || — || October 7, 2004 || Palomar || NEAT || — || align=right | 1.2 km || 
|-id=569 bgcolor=#fefefe
| 357569 ||  || — || October 8, 2004 || Anderson Mesa || LONEOS || FLO || align=right data-sort-value="0.87" | 870 m || 
|-id=570 bgcolor=#fefefe
| 357570 ||  || — || October 4, 2004 || Kitt Peak || Spacewatch || MAS || align=right data-sort-value="0.65" | 650 m || 
|-id=571 bgcolor=#fefefe
| 357571 ||  || — || October 4, 2004 || Kitt Peak || Spacewatch || — || align=right | 1.1 km || 
|-id=572 bgcolor=#fefefe
| 357572 ||  || — || October 6, 2004 || Kitt Peak || Spacewatch || — || align=right | 1.1 km || 
|-id=573 bgcolor=#d6d6d6
| 357573 ||  || — || October 7, 2004 || Kitt Peak || Spacewatch || — || align=right | 4.3 km || 
|-id=574 bgcolor=#fefefe
| 357574 ||  || — || October 7, 2004 || Kitt Peak || Spacewatch || FLO || align=right data-sort-value="0.66" | 660 m || 
|-id=575 bgcolor=#fefefe
| 357575 ||  || — || October 7, 2004 || Socorro || LINEAR || FLO || align=right data-sort-value="0.71" | 710 m || 
|-id=576 bgcolor=#d6d6d6
| 357576 ||  || — || October 9, 2004 || Socorro || LINEAR || — || align=right | 4.3 km || 
|-id=577 bgcolor=#fefefe
| 357577 ||  || — || October 8, 2004 || Kitt Peak || Spacewatch || — || align=right | 1.3 km || 
|-id=578 bgcolor=#d6d6d6
| 357578 ||  || — || October 8, 2004 || Kitt Peak || Spacewatch || — || align=right | 4.0 km || 
|-id=579 bgcolor=#fefefe
| 357579 ||  || — || September 10, 2004 || Socorro || LINEAR || — || align=right data-sort-value="0.91" | 910 m || 
|-id=580 bgcolor=#d6d6d6
| 357580 ||  || — || October 6, 2004 || Kitt Peak || Spacewatch || — || align=right | 4.2 km || 
|-id=581 bgcolor=#d6d6d6
| 357581 ||  || — || October 9, 2004 || Kitt Peak || Spacewatch || — || align=right | 2.9 km || 
|-id=582 bgcolor=#d6d6d6
| 357582 ||  || — || October 8, 2004 || Kitt Peak || Spacewatch || — || align=right | 3.4 km || 
|-id=583 bgcolor=#fefefe
| 357583 ||  || — || October 8, 2004 || Anderson Mesa || LONEOS || V || align=right data-sort-value="0.89" | 890 m || 
|-id=584 bgcolor=#fefefe
| 357584 ||  || — || October 15, 2004 || Socorro || LINEAR || — || align=right | 3.6 km || 
|-id=585 bgcolor=#fefefe
| 357585 ||  || — || November 3, 2004 || Kitt Peak || Spacewatch || — || align=right | 1.1 km || 
|-id=586 bgcolor=#fefefe
| 357586 ||  || — || November 3, 2004 || Palomar || NEAT || MAS || align=right data-sort-value="0.82" | 820 m || 
|-id=587 bgcolor=#fefefe
| 357587 ||  || — || November 4, 2004 || Kitt Peak || Spacewatch || — || align=right data-sort-value="0.82" | 820 m || 
|-id=588 bgcolor=#fefefe
| 357588 ||  || — || November 4, 2004 || Catalina || CSS || — || align=right data-sort-value="0.83" | 830 m || 
|-id=589 bgcolor=#FA8072
| 357589 ||  || — || November 10, 2004 || Socorro || LINEAR || H || align=right data-sort-value="0.90" | 900 m || 
|-id=590 bgcolor=#fefefe
| 357590 ||  || — || October 7, 2004 || Kitt Peak || Spacewatch || — || align=right data-sort-value="0.94" | 940 m || 
|-id=591 bgcolor=#fefefe
| 357591 ||  || — || November 12, 2004 || Catalina || CSS || — || align=right | 1.1 km || 
|-id=592 bgcolor=#fefefe
| 357592 ||  || — || November 12, 2004 || Catalina || CSS || NYS || align=right data-sort-value="0.77" | 770 m || 
|-id=593 bgcolor=#fefefe
| 357593 ||  || — || December 8, 2004 || Socorro || LINEAR || — || align=right data-sort-value="0.90" | 900 m || 
|-id=594 bgcolor=#FFC2E0
| 357594 ||  || — || December 12, 2004 || Socorro || LINEAR || APOPHA || align=right data-sort-value="0.45" | 450 m || 
|-id=595 bgcolor=#fefefe
| 357595 ||  || — || December 10, 2004 || Socorro || LINEAR || NYS || align=right data-sort-value="0.71" | 710 m || 
|-id=596 bgcolor=#fefefe
| 357596 ||  || — || December 10, 2004 || Kitt Peak || Spacewatch || — || align=right data-sort-value="0.98" | 980 m || 
|-id=597 bgcolor=#fefefe
| 357597 ||  || — || December 10, 2004 || Socorro || LINEAR || NYS || align=right data-sort-value="0.85" | 850 m || 
|-id=598 bgcolor=#fefefe
| 357598 ||  || — || December 10, 2004 || Anderson Mesa || LONEOS || — || align=right | 1.4 km || 
|-id=599 bgcolor=#fefefe
| 357599 || 2005 AA || — || January 2, 2005 || Begues Obs. || J. Manteca, J. Muñoz || MAS || align=right | 1.1 km || 
|-id=600 bgcolor=#fefefe
| 357600 ||  || — || January 6, 2005 || Catalina || CSS || NYS || align=right data-sort-value="0.81" | 810 m || 
|}

357601–357700 

|-bgcolor=#fefefe
| 357601 ||  || — || January 6, 2005 || Socorro || LINEAR || — || align=right | 1.1 km || 
|-id=602 bgcolor=#E9E9E9
| 357602 ||  || — || January 13, 2005 || Socorro || LINEAR || — || align=right | 1.3 km || 
|-id=603 bgcolor=#fefefe
| 357603 ||  || — || January 15, 2005 || Anderson Mesa || LONEOS || H || align=right | 1.0 km || 
|-id=604 bgcolor=#E9E9E9
| 357604 ||  || — || January 15, 2005 || Kitt Peak || Spacewatch || — || align=right | 1.3 km || 
|-id=605 bgcolor=#E9E9E9
| 357605 ||  || — || January 16, 2005 || Socorro || LINEAR || — || align=right | 4.3 km || 
|-id=606 bgcolor=#E9E9E9
| 357606 ||  || — || January 17, 2005 || Kitt Peak || Spacewatch || — || align=right | 1.4 km || 
|-id=607 bgcolor=#fefefe
| 357607 ||  || — || January 16, 2005 || Socorro || LINEAR || — || align=right | 1.0 km || 
|-id=608 bgcolor=#fefefe
| 357608 ||  || — || January 17, 2005 || Kitt Peak || Spacewatch || — || align=right data-sort-value="0.94" | 940 m || 
|-id=609 bgcolor=#fefefe
| 357609 ||  || — || January 18, 2005 || Mayhill || U. Wolff || NYS || align=right data-sort-value="0.60" | 600 m || 
|-id=610 bgcolor=#fefefe
| 357610 ||  || — || February 2, 2005 || Catalina || CSS || — || align=right | 1.2 km || 
|-id=611 bgcolor=#fefefe
| 357611 ||  || — || February 2, 2005 || Kitt Peak || Spacewatch || H || align=right data-sort-value="0.82" | 820 m || 
|-id=612 bgcolor=#fefefe
| 357612 ||  || — || February 3, 2005 || Socorro || LINEAR || H || align=right data-sort-value="0.82" | 820 m || 
|-id=613 bgcolor=#fefefe
| 357613 ||  || — || February 4, 2005 || Kitt Peak || Spacewatch || MAS || align=right data-sort-value="0.80" | 800 m || 
|-id=614 bgcolor=#fefefe
| 357614 ||  || — || February 9, 2005 || Socorro || LINEAR || H || align=right data-sort-value="0.94" | 940 m || 
|-id=615 bgcolor=#fefefe
| 357615 ||  || — || March 3, 2005 || Catalina || CSS || H || align=right | 1.0 km || 
|-id=616 bgcolor=#E9E9E9
| 357616 ||  || — || March 3, 2005 || Kitt Peak || Spacewatch || HNS || align=right | 1.5 km || 
|-id=617 bgcolor=#fefefe
| 357617 ||  || — || March 3, 2005 || Kitt Peak || Spacewatch || H || align=right data-sort-value="0.91" | 910 m || 
|-id=618 bgcolor=#FFC2E0
| 357618 ||  || — || March 4, 2005 || Socorro || LINEAR || APO || align=right data-sort-value="0.56" | 560 m || 
|-id=619 bgcolor=#fefefe
| 357619 ||  || — || March 8, 2005 || Goodricke-Pigott || R. A. Tucker || H || align=right data-sort-value="0.97" | 970 m || 
|-id=620 bgcolor=#E9E9E9
| 357620 ||  || — || March 3, 2005 || Kitt Peak || Spacewatch || — || align=right data-sort-value="0.95" | 950 m || 
|-id=621 bgcolor=#FFC2E0
| 357621 ||  || — || March 8, 2005 || Kitt Peak || Spacewatch || APO || align=right data-sort-value="0.63" | 630 m || 
|-id=622 bgcolor=#FFC2E0
| 357622 ||  || — || March 11, 2005 || Catalina || CSS || APOPHA || align=right data-sort-value="0.31" | 310 m || 
|-id=623 bgcolor=#E9E9E9
| 357623 ||  || — || March 9, 2005 || Socorro || LINEAR || — || align=right | 1.6 km || 
|-id=624 bgcolor=#fefefe
| 357624 ||  || — || March 8, 2005 || Catalina || CSS || H || align=right | 1.0 km || 
|-id=625 bgcolor=#E9E9E9
| 357625 ||  || — || March 10, 2005 || Mount Lemmon || Mount Lemmon Survey || — || align=right | 1.2 km || 
|-id=626 bgcolor=#fefefe
| 357626 ||  || — || March 11, 2005 || Mount Lemmon || Mount Lemmon Survey || H || align=right data-sort-value="0.87" | 870 m || 
|-id=627 bgcolor=#E9E9E9
| 357627 ||  || — || March 11, 2005 || Mount Lemmon || Mount Lemmon Survey || — || align=right | 2.2 km || 
|-id=628 bgcolor=#E9E9E9
| 357628 ||  || — || March 9, 2005 || Socorro || LINEAR || — || align=right | 1.0 km || 
|-id=629 bgcolor=#FA8072
| 357629 ||  || — || March 11, 2005 || Anderson Mesa || LONEOS || H || align=right data-sort-value="0.87" | 870 m || 
|-id=630 bgcolor=#E9E9E9
| 357630 ||  || — || March 11, 2005 || Mount Lemmon || Mount Lemmon Survey || — || align=right | 1.0 km || 
|-id=631 bgcolor=#E9E9E9
| 357631 ||  || — || March 10, 2005 || Anderson Mesa || LONEOS || — || align=right | 1.1 km || 
|-id=632 bgcolor=#E9E9E9
| 357632 ||  || — || March 8, 2005 || Mount Lemmon || Mount Lemmon Survey || — || align=right | 1.5 km || 
|-id=633 bgcolor=#E9E9E9
| 357633 ||  || — || April 1, 2005 || Kitt Peak || Spacewatch || — || align=right | 1.1 km || 
|-id=634 bgcolor=#E9E9E9
| 357634 ||  || — || April 1, 2005 || Kitt Peak || Spacewatch || — || align=right | 1.6 km || 
|-id=635 bgcolor=#FA8072
| 357635 ||  || — || April 2, 2005 || Mount Lemmon || Mount Lemmon Survey || — || align=right | 1.9 km || 
|-id=636 bgcolor=#E9E9E9
| 357636 ||  || — || April 2, 2005 || Mount Lemmon || Mount Lemmon Survey || — || align=right data-sort-value="0.77" | 770 m || 
|-id=637 bgcolor=#E9E9E9
| 357637 ||  || — || April 2, 2005 || Mount Lemmon || Mount Lemmon Survey || — || align=right | 2.3 km || 
|-id=638 bgcolor=#E9E9E9
| 357638 ||  || — || April 6, 2005 || Mount Lemmon || Mount Lemmon Survey || — || align=right | 2.0 km || 
|-id=639 bgcolor=#E9E9E9
| 357639 ||  || — || April 7, 2005 || Kitt Peak || Spacewatch || GER || align=right | 1.5 km || 
|-id=640 bgcolor=#E9E9E9
| 357640 ||  || — || April 10, 2005 || Kitt Peak || Spacewatch || — || align=right | 1.3 km || 
|-id=641 bgcolor=#E9E9E9
| 357641 ||  || — || April 11, 2005 || Kitt Peak || Spacewatch || KRM || align=right | 2.1 km || 
|-id=642 bgcolor=#E9E9E9
| 357642 ||  || — || April 9, 2005 || Catalina || CSS || — || align=right | 1.5 km || 
|-id=643 bgcolor=#E9E9E9
| 357643 ||  || — || April 11, 2005 || Anderson Mesa || LONEOS || — || align=right | 1.3 km || 
|-id=644 bgcolor=#fefefe
| 357644 ||  || — || April 1, 2005 || Catalina || CSS || H || align=right | 1.0 km || 
|-id=645 bgcolor=#E9E9E9
| 357645 ||  || — || April 8, 2005 || Socorro || LINEAR || — || align=right | 1.5 km || 
|-id=646 bgcolor=#fefefe
| 357646 ||  || — || April 10, 2005 || Kitt Peak || Spacewatch || H || align=right data-sort-value="0.68" | 680 m || 
|-id=647 bgcolor=#E9E9E9
| 357647 ||  || — || April 14, 2005 || Kitt Peak || Spacewatch || — || align=right data-sort-value="0.91" | 910 m || 
|-id=648 bgcolor=#E9E9E9
| 357648 ||  || — || April 15, 2005 || Reedy Creek || J. Broughton || — || align=right | 3.1 km || 
|-id=649 bgcolor=#E9E9E9
| 357649 ||  || — || March 18, 2005 || Catalina || CSS || — || align=right | 3.0 km || 
|-id=650 bgcolor=#E9E9E9
| 357650 ||  || — || April 14, 2005 || Kitt Peak || Spacewatch || — || align=right data-sort-value="0.97" | 970 m || 
|-id=651 bgcolor=#E9E9E9
| 357651 ||  || — || April 10, 2005 || Mount Lemmon || Mount Lemmon Survey || — || align=right | 2.2 km || 
|-id=652 bgcolor=#E9E9E9
| 357652 ||  || — || April 16, 2005 || Kitt Peak || Spacewatch || — || align=right | 1.0 km || 
|-id=653 bgcolor=#E9E9E9
| 357653 ||  || — || May 4, 2005 || Kitt Peak || Spacewatch || — || align=right | 1.3 km || 
|-id=654 bgcolor=#E9E9E9
| 357654 ||  || — || May 4, 2005 || Catalina || CSS || — || align=right | 1.5 km || 
|-id=655 bgcolor=#E9E9E9
| 357655 ||  || — || May 7, 2005 || Catalina || CSS || — || align=right | 1.5 km || 
|-id=656 bgcolor=#C2FFFF
| 357656 ||  || — || May 8, 2005 || Kitt Peak || Spacewatch || L4 || align=right | 10 km || 
|-id=657 bgcolor=#E9E9E9
| 357657 ||  || — || May 4, 2005 || Siding Spring || SSS || — || align=right | 1.1 km || 
|-id=658 bgcolor=#E9E9E9
| 357658 ||  || — || May 6, 2005 || Socorro || LINEAR || JUN || align=right | 1.1 km || 
|-id=659 bgcolor=#E9E9E9
| 357659 ||  || — || May 9, 2005 || Mount Lemmon || Mount Lemmon Survey || — || align=right | 1.0 km || 
|-id=660 bgcolor=#E9E9E9
| 357660 ||  || — || May 8, 2005 || Kitt Peak || Spacewatch || — || align=right | 1.7 km || 
|-id=661 bgcolor=#E9E9E9
| 357661 ||  || — || May 6, 2005 || Anderson Mesa || LONEOS || — || align=right | 1.8 km || 
|-id=662 bgcolor=#E9E9E9
| 357662 ||  || — || May 9, 2005 || Catalina || CSS || — || align=right | 1.1 km || 
|-id=663 bgcolor=#E9E9E9
| 357663 ||  || — || May 8, 2005 || Kitt Peak || Spacewatch || BAR || align=right | 1.3 km || 
|-id=664 bgcolor=#E9E9E9
| 357664 ||  || — || May 7, 2005 || Catalina || CSS || — || align=right | 3.0 km || 
|-id=665 bgcolor=#E9E9E9
| 357665 ||  || — || May 7, 2005 || Catalina || CSS || — || align=right data-sort-value="0.99" | 990 m || 
|-id=666 bgcolor=#E9E9E9
| 357666 ||  || — || May 10, 2005 || Kitt Peak || Spacewatch || — || align=right | 1.3 km || 
|-id=667 bgcolor=#E9E9E9
| 357667 ||  || — || May 10, 2005 || Kitt Peak || Spacewatch || — || align=right | 1.1 km || 
|-id=668 bgcolor=#E9E9E9
| 357668 ||  || — || May 13, 2005 || Catalina || CSS || — || align=right | 1.1 km || 
|-id=669 bgcolor=#E9E9E9
| 357669 ||  || — || May 14, 2005 || Kitt Peak || Spacewatch || — || align=right | 1.0 km || 
|-id=670 bgcolor=#E9E9E9
| 357670 ||  || — || May 14, 2005 || Kitt Peak || Spacewatch || — || align=right | 2.4 km || 
|-id=671 bgcolor=#E9E9E9
| 357671 ||  || — || May 15, 2005 || Palomar || NEAT || MAR || align=right | 1.3 km || 
|-id=672 bgcolor=#E9E9E9
| 357672 ||  || — || May 3, 2005 || Kitt Peak || Spacewatch || — || align=right | 1.9 km || 
|-id=673 bgcolor=#E9E9E9
| 357673 ||  || — || May 4, 2005 || Kitt Peak || Spacewatch || ADE || align=right | 2.3 km || 
|-id=674 bgcolor=#fefefe
| 357674 ||  || — || May 4, 2005 || Catalina || CSS || H || align=right data-sort-value="0.99" | 990 m || 
|-id=675 bgcolor=#E9E9E9
| 357675 ||  || — || May 9, 2005 || Catalina || CSS || ADE || align=right | 2.2 km || 
|-id=676 bgcolor=#E9E9E9
| 357676 ||  || — || May 10, 2005 || Kitt Peak || Spacewatch || — || align=right | 1.9 km || 
|-id=677 bgcolor=#E9E9E9
| 357677 ||  || — || June 1, 2005 || Mount Lemmon || Mount Lemmon Survey || MAR || align=right | 1.5 km || 
|-id=678 bgcolor=#E9E9E9
| 357678 ||  || — || June 2, 2005 || Socorro || LINEAR || — || align=right | 4.2 km || 
|-id=679 bgcolor=#E9E9E9
| 357679 ||  || — || June 11, 2005 || Kitt Peak || Spacewatch || — || align=right | 1.6 km || 
|-id=680 bgcolor=#E9E9E9
| 357680 ||  || — || June 27, 2005 || Kitt Peak || Spacewatch || JUN || align=right | 1.2 km || 
|-id=681 bgcolor=#E9E9E9
| 357681 ||  || — || June 29, 2005 || Kitt Peak || Spacewatch || — || align=right | 2.5 km || 
|-id=682 bgcolor=#E9E9E9
| 357682 ||  || — || June 29, 2005 || Kitt Peak || Spacewatch || — || align=right | 2.3 km || 
|-id=683 bgcolor=#d6d6d6
| 357683 ||  || — || June 30, 2005 || Kitt Peak || Spacewatch || — || align=right | 2.9 km || 
|-id=684 bgcolor=#d6d6d6
| 357684 ||  || — || June 30, 2005 || Kitt Peak || Spacewatch || — || align=right | 2.7 km || 
|-id=685 bgcolor=#E9E9E9
| 357685 ||  || — || July 3, 2005 || Mount Lemmon || Mount Lemmon Survey || — || align=right | 2.3 km || 
|-id=686 bgcolor=#E9E9E9
| 357686 ||  || — || July 1, 2005 || Kitt Peak || Spacewatch || MIS || align=right | 2.5 km || 
|-id=687 bgcolor=#E9E9E9
| 357687 ||  || — || July 3, 2005 || Mount Lemmon || Mount Lemmon Survey || — || align=right | 1.9 km || 
|-id=688 bgcolor=#d6d6d6
| 357688 ||  || — || February 1, 2003 || Kitt Peak || Spacewatch || EOS || align=right | 1.9 km || 
|-id=689 bgcolor=#d6d6d6
| 357689 ||  || — || July 4, 2005 || Kitt Peak || Spacewatch || — || align=right | 2.2 km || 
|-id=690 bgcolor=#E9E9E9
| 357690 ||  || — || June 15, 2005 || Mount Lemmon || Mount Lemmon Survey || — || align=right | 2.3 km || 
|-id=691 bgcolor=#E9E9E9
| 357691 ||  || — || July 5, 2005 || Mount Lemmon || Mount Lemmon Survey || AGN || align=right | 1.1 km || 
|-id=692 bgcolor=#d6d6d6
| 357692 ||  || — || July 1, 2005 || Kitt Peak || Spacewatch || 628 || align=right | 1.8 km || 
|-id=693 bgcolor=#E9E9E9
| 357693 ||  || — || July 3, 2005 || Palomar || NEAT || — || align=right | 2.8 km || 
|-id=694 bgcolor=#E9E9E9
| 357694 ||  || — || July 30, 2005 || Palomar || NEAT || — || align=right | 3.0 km || 
|-id=695 bgcolor=#d6d6d6
| 357695 ||  || — || July 30, 2005 || Palomar || NEAT || EOS || align=right | 2.0 km || 
|-id=696 bgcolor=#E9E9E9
| 357696 ||  || — || July 28, 2005 || Palomar || NEAT || JUN || align=right | 1.3 km || 
|-id=697 bgcolor=#E9E9E9
| 357697 ||  || — || July 31, 2005 || Palomar || NEAT || JUN || align=right | 1.4 km || 
|-id=698 bgcolor=#E9E9E9
| 357698 ||  || — || July 28, 2005 || Palomar || NEAT || AGN || align=right | 1.2 km || 
|-id=699 bgcolor=#d6d6d6
| 357699 ||  || — || August 2, 2005 || Socorro || LINEAR || TRP || align=right | 3.4 km || 
|-id=700 bgcolor=#E9E9E9
| 357700 ||  || — || August 4, 2005 || Palomar || NEAT || — || align=right | 3.2 km || 
|}

357701–357800 

|-bgcolor=#d6d6d6
| 357701 ||  || — || August 4, 2005 || Palomar || NEAT || NAE || align=right | 3.2 km || 
|-id=702 bgcolor=#E9E9E9
| 357702 ||  || — || August 6, 2005 || Socorro || LINEAR || — || align=right | 1.7 km || 
|-id=703 bgcolor=#E9E9E9
| 357703 ||  || — || August 5, 2005 || Palomar || NEAT || — || align=right | 2.9 km || 
|-id=704 bgcolor=#E9E9E9
| 357704 ||  || — || August 8, 2005 || Siding Spring || SSS || — || align=right | 2.4 km || 
|-id=705 bgcolor=#E9E9E9
| 357705 ||  || — || August 24, 2005 || Palomar || NEAT || — || align=right | 3.3 km || 
|-id=706 bgcolor=#d6d6d6
| 357706 ||  || — || August 25, 2005 || Palomar || NEAT || — || align=right | 2.3 km || 
|-id=707 bgcolor=#d6d6d6
| 357707 ||  || — || August 25, 2005 || Palomar || NEAT || — || align=right | 2.7 km || 
|-id=708 bgcolor=#E9E9E9
| 357708 ||  || — || July 30, 2005 || Palomar || NEAT || — || align=right | 1.5 km || 
|-id=709 bgcolor=#d6d6d6
| 357709 ||  || — || August 25, 2005 || Palomar || NEAT || EOS || align=right | 1.9 km || 
|-id=710 bgcolor=#d6d6d6
| 357710 ||  || — || August 25, 2005 || Palomar || NEAT || — || align=right | 2.1 km || 
|-id=711 bgcolor=#E9E9E9
| 357711 ||  || — || August 26, 2005 || Palomar || NEAT || — || align=right | 3.1 km || 
|-id=712 bgcolor=#E9E9E9
| 357712 ||  || — || August 26, 2005 || Anderson Mesa || LONEOS || GEF || align=right | 1.6 km || 
|-id=713 bgcolor=#E9E9E9
| 357713 ||  || — || August 26, 2005 || Palomar || NEAT || — || align=right | 2.8 km || 
|-id=714 bgcolor=#E9E9E9
| 357714 ||  || — || August 27, 2005 || Kitt Peak || Spacewatch || CLO || align=right | 2.7 km || 
|-id=715 bgcolor=#d6d6d6
| 357715 ||  || — || August 26, 2005 || Palomar || NEAT || — || align=right | 2.3 km || 
|-id=716 bgcolor=#d6d6d6
| 357716 ||  || — || August 26, 2005 || Palomar || NEAT || EOS || align=right | 2.1 km || 
|-id=717 bgcolor=#d6d6d6
| 357717 ||  || — || August 25, 2005 || Palomar || NEAT || — || align=right | 4.5 km || 
|-id=718 bgcolor=#d6d6d6
| 357718 ||  || — || August 29, 2005 || Kitt Peak || Spacewatch || — || align=right | 2.5 km || 
|-id=719 bgcolor=#d6d6d6
| 357719 ||  || — || September 1, 2005 || Kitt Peak || Spacewatch || — || align=right | 2.5 km || 
|-id=720 bgcolor=#d6d6d6
| 357720 ||  || — || August 28, 2005 || Kitt Peak || Spacewatch || KOR || align=right | 1.6 km || 
|-id=721 bgcolor=#d6d6d6
| 357721 ||  || — || July 24, 1995 || Kitt Peak || Spacewatch || — || align=right | 2.8 km || 
|-id=722 bgcolor=#fefefe
| 357722 ||  || — || August 28, 2005 || Kitt Peak || Spacewatch || — || align=right data-sort-value="0.53" | 530 m || 
|-id=723 bgcolor=#d6d6d6
| 357723 ||  || — || August 28, 2005 || Kitt Peak || Spacewatch || — || align=right | 2.3 km || 
|-id=724 bgcolor=#d6d6d6
| 357724 ||  || — || August 28, 2005 || Kitt Peak || Spacewatch || — || align=right | 3.2 km || 
|-id=725 bgcolor=#d6d6d6
| 357725 ||  || — || August 28, 2005 || Kitt Peak || Spacewatch || — || align=right | 2.2 km || 
|-id=726 bgcolor=#d6d6d6
| 357726 ||  || — || August 28, 2005 || Kitt Peak || Spacewatch || — || align=right | 2.6 km || 
|-id=727 bgcolor=#d6d6d6
| 357727 ||  || — || August 28, 2005 || Kitt Peak || Spacewatch || — || align=right | 3.0 km || 
|-id=728 bgcolor=#d6d6d6
| 357728 ||  || — || August 28, 2005 || Kitt Peak || Spacewatch || — || align=right | 2.9 km || 
|-id=729 bgcolor=#d6d6d6
| 357729 ||  || — || August 29, 2005 || Palomar || NEAT || — || align=right | 3.2 km || 
|-id=730 bgcolor=#d6d6d6
| 357730 ||  || — || August 30, 2005 || Palomar || NEAT || EOS || align=right | 2.3 km || 
|-id=731 bgcolor=#E9E9E9
| 357731 ||  || — || August 28, 2005 || Kitt Peak || Spacewatch || — || align=right | 3.1 km || 
|-id=732 bgcolor=#d6d6d6
| 357732 ||  || — || September 1, 2005 || Kitt Peak || Spacewatch || — || align=right | 3.1 km || 
|-id=733 bgcolor=#E9E9E9
| 357733 ||  || — || September 8, 2005 || Socorro || LINEAR || — || align=right | 3.4 km || 
|-id=734 bgcolor=#d6d6d6
| 357734 ||  || — || September 1, 2005 || Kitt Peak || Spacewatch || — || align=right | 2.7 km || 
|-id=735 bgcolor=#d6d6d6
| 357735 ||  || — || September 10, 2005 || Anderson Mesa || LONEOS || THB || align=right | 4.4 km || 
|-id=736 bgcolor=#d6d6d6
| 357736 ||  || — || September 6, 2005 || Anderson Mesa || LONEOS || SAN || align=right | 1.8 km || 
|-id=737 bgcolor=#d6d6d6
| 357737 ||  || — || August 31, 2005 || Kitt Peak || Spacewatch || EUP || align=right | 3.5 km || 
|-id=738 bgcolor=#d6d6d6
| 357738 ||  || — || September 13, 2005 || Apache Point || A. C. Becker || — || align=right | 2.0 km || 
|-id=739 bgcolor=#E9E9E9
| 357739 ||  || — || September 13, 2005 || Apache Point || A. C. Becker || — || align=right | 2.5 km || 
|-id=740 bgcolor=#d6d6d6
| 357740 ||  || — || September 24, 2005 || Kitt Peak || Spacewatch || — || align=right | 2.9 km || 
|-id=741 bgcolor=#d6d6d6
| 357741 ||  || — || September 25, 2005 || Kitt Peak || Spacewatch || THM || align=right | 2.8 km || 
|-id=742 bgcolor=#d6d6d6
| 357742 ||  || — || September 26, 2005 || Kitt Peak || Spacewatch || — || align=right | 2.8 km || 
|-id=743 bgcolor=#d6d6d6
| 357743 ||  || — || September 23, 2005 || Kitt Peak || Spacewatch || EOS || align=right | 3.8 km || 
|-id=744 bgcolor=#d6d6d6
| 357744 ||  || — || September 23, 2005 || Kitt Peak || Spacewatch || — || align=right | 4.5 km || 
|-id=745 bgcolor=#d6d6d6
| 357745 ||  || — || September 24, 2005 || Kitt Peak || Spacewatch || — || align=right | 2.8 km || 
|-id=746 bgcolor=#d6d6d6
| 357746 ||  || — || September 24, 2005 || Kitt Peak || Spacewatch || EOS || align=right | 2.4 km || 
|-id=747 bgcolor=#d6d6d6
| 357747 ||  || — || September 25, 2005 || Kitt Peak || Spacewatch || — || align=right | 4.4 km || 
|-id=748 bgcolor=#E9E9E9
| 357748 ||  || — || September 26, 2005 || Kitt Peak || Spacewatch || — || align=right | 2.8 km || 
|-id=749 bgcolor=#d6d6d6
| 357749 ||  || — || September 26, 2005 || Kitt Peak || Spacewatch || EOS || align=right | 1.7 km || 
|-id=750 bgcolor=#d6d6d6
| 357750 ||  || — || September 23, 2005 || Kitt Peak || Spacewatch || — || align=right | 2.4 km || 
|-id=751 bgcolor=#d6d6d6
| 357751 ||  || — || September 23, 2005 || Catalina || CSS || — || align=right | 4.2 km || 
|-id=752 bgcolor=#d6d6d6
| 357752 ||  || — || September 24, 2005 || Kitt Peak || Spacewatch || — || align=right | 2.8 km || 
|-id=753 bgcolor=#d6d6d6
| 357753 ||  || — || September 24, 2005 || Kitt Peak || Spacewatch || KOR || align=right | 1.5 km || 
|-id=754 bgcolor=#d6d6d6
| 357754 ||  || — || September 24, 2005 || Kitt Peak || Spacewatch || — || align=right | 3.4 km || 
|-id=755 bgcolor=#d6d6d6
| 357755 ||  || — || September 24, 2005 || Kitt Peak || Spacewatch || — || align=right | 3.4 km || 
|-id=756 bgcolor=#d6d6d6
| 357756 ||  || — || September 24, 2005 || Kitt Peak || Spacewatch || — || align=right | 3.6 km || 
|-id=757 bgcolor=#d6d6d6
| 357757 ||  || — || September 24, 2005 || Kitt Peak || Spacewatch || EOS || align=right | 2.1 km || 
|-id=758 bgcolor=#d6d6d6
| 357758 ||  || — || September 25, 2005 || Kitt Peak || Spacewatch || — || align=right | 3.5 km || 
|-id=759 bgcolor=#d6d6d6
| 357759 ||  || — || September 26, 2005 || Kitt Peak || Spacewatch || — || align=right | 3.4 km || 
|-id=760 bgcolor=#d6d6d6
| 357760 ||  || — || September 26, 2005 || Kitt Peak || Spacewatch || — || align=right | 4.0 km || 
|-id=761 bgcolor=#d6d6d6
| 357761 ||  || — || September 26, 2005 || Kitt Peak || Spacewatch || — || align=right | 2.5 km || 
|-id=762 bgcolor=#d6d6d6
| 357762 ||  || — || September 26, 2005 || Kitt Peak || Spacewatch || — || align=right | 2.9 km || 
|-id=763 bgcolor=#d6d6d6
| 357763 ||  || — || September 28, 2005 || Palomar || NEAT || THB || align=right | 3.8 km || 
|-id=764 bgcolor=#E9E9E9
| 357764 ||  || — || September 29, 2005 || Palomar || NEAT || — || align=right | 3.6 km || 
|-id=765 bgcolor=#d6d6d6
| 357765 ||  || — || September 29, 2005 || Mount Lemmon || Mount Lemmon Survey || MEL || align=right | 3.1 km || 
|-id=766 bgcolor=#d6d6d6
| 357766 ||  || — || September 29, 2005 || Mount Lemmon || Mount Lemmon Survey || — || align=right | 4.3 km || 
|-id=767 bgcolor=#d6d6d6
| 357767 ||  || — || September 29, 2005 || Mount Lemmon || Mount Lemmon Survey || URS || align=right | 4.1 km || 
|-id=768 bgcolor=#d6d6d6
| 357768 ||  || — || September 25, 2005 || Kitt Peak || Spacewatch || — || align=right | 2.9 km || 
|-id=769 bgcolor=#d6d6d6
| 357769 ||  || — || September 26, 2005 || Palomar || NEAT || — || align=right | 4.9 km || 
|-id=770 bgcolor=#d6d6d6
| 357770 ||  || — || September 27, 2005 || Kitt Peak || Spacewatch || TIR || align=right | 2.4 km || 
|-id=771 bgcolor=#d6d6d6
| 357771 ||  || — || September 29, 2005 || Kitt Peak || Spacewatch || — || align=right | 3.2 km || 
|-id=772 bgcolor=#d6d6d6
| 357772 ||  || — || September 29, 2005 || Kitt Peak || Spacewatch || — || align=right | 2.6 km || 
|-id=773 bgcolor=#d6d6d6
| 357773 ||  || — || September 29, 2005 || Kitt Peak || Spacewatch || — || align=right | 3.5 km || 
|-id=774 bgcolor=#d6d6d6
| 357774 ||  || — || September 29, 2005 || Kitt Peak || Spacewatch || — || align=right | 3.8 km || 
|-id=775 bgcolor=#d6d6d6
| 357775 ||  || — || September 29, 2005 || Kitt Peak || Spacewatch || EOS || align=right | 2.2 km || 
|-id=776 bgcolor=#d6d6d6
| 357776 ||  || — || September 30, 2005 || Mount Lemmon || Mount Lemmon Survey || — || align=right | 3.0 km || 
|-id=777 bgcolor=#d6d6d6
| 357777 ||  || — || September 30, 2005 || Mount Lemmon || Mount Lemmon Survey || — || align=right | 2.8 km || 
|-id=778 bgcolor=#d6d6d6
| 357778 ||  || — || September 30, 2005 || Mount Lemmon || Mount Lemmon Survey || — || align=right | 2.8 km || 
|-id=779 bgcolor=#d6d6d6
| 357779 ||  || — || September 30, 2005 || Mount Lemmon || Mount Lemmon Survey || — || align=right | 3.6 km || 
|-id=780 bgcolor=#d6d6d6
| 357780 ||  || — || September 30, 2005 || Mount Lemmon || Mount Lemmon Survey || — || align=right | 4.2 km || 
|-id=781 bgcolor=#E9E9E9
| 357781 ||  || — || September 22, 2005 || Palomar || NEAT || — || align=right | 1.6 km || 
|-id=782 bgcolor=#d6d6d6
| 357782 ||  || — || September 22, 2005 || Palomar || NEAT || — || align=right | 2.6 km || 
|-id=783 bgcolor=#d6d6d6
| 357783 ||  || — || September 23, 2005 || Catalina || CSS || — || align=right | 2.5 km || 
|-id=784 bgcolor=#fefefe
| 357784 ||  || — || September 23, 2005 || Kitt Peak || Spacewatch || — || align=right data-sort-value="0.45" | 450 m || 
|-id=785 bgcolor=#d6d6d6
| 357785 ||  || — || September 24, 2005 || Apache Point || A. C. Becker || — || align=right | 3.2 km || 
|-id=786 bgcolor=#d6d6d6
| 357786 ||  || — || September 21, 2005 || Apache Point || A. C. Becker || — || align=right | 3.7 km || 
|-id=787 bgcolor=#d6d6d6
| 357787 ||  || — || September 25, 2005 || Apache Point || A. C. Becker || — || align=right | 3.1 km || 
|-id=788 bgcolor=#E9E9E9
| 357788 ||  || — || September 23, 2005 || Kitt Peak || Spacewatch || — || align=right | 2.4 km || 
|-id=789 bgcolor=#d6d6d6
| 357789 ||  || — || September 30, 2005 || Anderson Mesa || LONEOS || — || align=right | 2.6 km || 
|-id=790 bgcolor=#d6d6d6
| 357790 ||  || — || October 1, 2005 || Catalina || CSS || — || align=right | 3.0 km || 
|-id=791 bgcolor=#d6d6d6
| 357791 ||  || — || October 1, 2005 || Catalina || CSS || — || align=right | 4.5 km || 
|-id=792 bgcolor=#d6d6d6
| 357792 ||  || — || October 1, 2005 || Mount Lemmon || Mount Lemmon Survey || — || align=right | 2.8 km || 
|-id=793 bgcolor=#d6d6d6
| 357793 ||  || — || October 4, 2005 || Palomar || NEAT || EUP || align=right | 3.9 km || 
|-id=794 bgcolor=#d6d6d6
| 357794 ||  || — || October 1, 2005 || Kitt Peak || Spacewatch || EOS || align=right | 1.7 km || 
|-id=795 bgcolor=#d6d6d6
| 357795 ||  || — || October 1, 2005 || Catalina || CSS || EOS || align=right | 2.1 km || 
|-id=796 bgcolor=#d6d6d6
| 357796 ||  || — || October 1, 2005 || Mount Lemmon || Mount Lemmon Survey || HYG || align=right | 3.0 km || 
|-id=797 bgcolor=#d6d6d6
| 357797 ||  || — || October 3, 2005 || Kitt Peak || Spacewatch || — || align=right | 2.8 km || 
|-id=798 bgcolor=#d6d6d6
| 357798 ||  || — || October 7, 2005 || Catalina || CSS || — || align=right | 5.8 km || 
|-id=799 bgcolor=#d6d6d6
| 357799 ||  || — || October 3, 2005 || Kitt Peak || Spacewatch || — || align=right | 3.4 km || 
|-id=800 bgcolor=#d6d6d6
| 357800 ||  || — || October 4, 2005 || Mount Lemmon || Mount Lemmon Survey || — || align=right | 3.1 km || 
|}

357801–357900 

|-bgcolor=#E9E9E9
| 357801 ||  || — || October 5, 2005 || Mount Lemmon || Mount Lemmon Survey || — || align=right | 3.2 km || 
|-id=802 bgcolor=#d6d6d6
| 357802 ||  || — || October 6, 2005 || Anderson Mesa || LONEOS || TIR || align=right | 4.3 km || 
|-id=803 bgcolor=#d6d6d6
| 357803 ||  || — || October 7, 2005 || Kitt Peak || Spacewatch || — || align=right | 2.4 km || 
|-id=804 bgcolor=#d6d6d6
| 357804 ||  || — || October 7, 2005 || Kitt Peak || Spacewatch || — || align=right | 2.8 km || 
|-id=805 bgcolor=#d6d6d6
| 357805 ||  || — || October 6, 2005 || Kitt Peak || Spacewatch || — || align=right | 2.6 km || 
|-id=806 bgcolor=#d6d6d6
| 357806 ||  || — || October 8, 2005 || Kitt Peak || Spacewatch || — || align=right | 2.8 km || 
|-id=807 bgcolor=#d6d6d6
| 357807 ||  || — || October 9, 2005 || Kitt Peak || Spacewatch || — || align=right | 3.7 km || 
|-id=808 bgcolor=#d6d6d6
| 357808 ||  || — || October 9, 2005 || Kitt Peak || Spacewatch || — || align=right | 2.6 km || 
|-id=809 bgcolor=#d6d6d6
| 357809 ||  || — || October 9, 2005 || Kitt Peak || Spacewatch || — || align=right | 3.3 km || 
|-id=810 bgcolor=#d6d6d6
| 357810 ||  || — || October 9, 2005 || Kitt Peak || Spacewatch || — || align=right | 2.2 km || 
|-id=811 bgcolor=#fefefe
| 357811 ||  || — || October 9, 2005 || Kitt Peak || Spacewatch || — || align=right data-sort-value="0.61" | 610 m || 
|-id=812 bgcolor=#d6d6d6
| 357812 ||  || — || October 9, 2005 || Kitt Peak || Spacewatch || HYG || align=right | 3.0 km || 
|-id=813 bgcolor=#d6d6d6
| 357813 ||  || — || October 10, 2005 || Kitt Peak || Spacewatch || — || align=right | 4.5 km || 
|-id=814 bgcolor=#d6d6d6
| 357814 ||  || — || October 2, 2005 || Mount Lemmon || Mount Lemmon Survey || — || align=right | 2.7 km || 
|-id=815 bgcolor=#d6d6d6
| 357815 ||  || — || October 6, 2005 || Kitt Peak || Spacewatch || — || align=right | 2.4 km || 
|-id=816 bgcolor=#d6d6d6
| 357816 ||  || — || October 1, 2005 || Kitt Peak || Spacewatch || — || align=right | 3.1 km || 
|-id=817 bgcolor=#d6d6d6
| 357817 ||  || — || October 10, 2005 || Kitt Peak || Spacewatch || — || align=right | 3.2 km || 
|-id=818 bgcolor=#d6d6d6
| 357818 ||  || — || October 2, 2005 || Mount Lemmon || Mount Lemmon Survey || — || align=right | 2.8 km || 
|-id=819 bgcolor=#d6d6d6
| 357819 ||  || — || October 23, 2005 || Kitt Peak || Spacewatch || — || align=right | 2.9 km || 
|-id=820 bgcolor=#d6d6d6
| 357820 ||  || — || October 23, 2005 || Catalina || CSS || HYG || align=right | 3.0 km || 
|-id=821 bgcolor=#d6d6d6
| 357821 ||  || — || October 23, 2005 || Catalina || CSS || — || align=right | 3.8 km || 
|-id=822 bgcolor=#d6d6d6
| 357822 ||  || — || October 23, 2005 || Catalina || CSS || — || align=right | 3.3 km || 
|-id=823 bgcolor=#d6d6d6
| 357823 ||  || — || October 24, 2005 || Kitt Peak || Spacewatch || — || align=right | 3.4 km || 
|-id=824 bgcolor=#d6d6d6
| 357824 ||  || — || October 23, 2005 || Catalina || CSS || — || align=right | 4.6 km || 
|-id=825 bgcolor=#E9E9E9
| 357825 ||  || — || October 23, 2005 || Catalina || CSS || — || align=right | 4.4 km || 
|-id=826 bgcolor=#d6d6d6
| 357826 ||  || — || October 24, 2005 || Anderson Mesa || LONEOS || EOS || align=right | 2.3 km || 
|-id=827 bgcolor=#d6d6d6
| 357827 ||  || — || October 25, 2005 || Mount Lemmon || Mount Lemmon Survey || — || align=right | 2.7 km || 
|-id=828 bgcolor=#d6d6d6
| 357828 ||  || — || October 22, 2005 || Kitt Peak || Spacewatch || EOS || align=right | 2.0 km || 
|-id=829 bgcolor=#d6d6d6
| 357829 ||  || — || October 22, 2005 || Kitt Peak || Spacewatch || THM || align=right | 2.5 km || 
|-id=830 bgcolor=#d6d6d6
| 357830 ||  || — || October 22, 2005 || Kitt Peak || Spacewatch || — || align=right | 3.2 km || 
|-id=831 bgcolor=#fefefe
| 357831 ||  || — || October 22, 2005 || Kitt Peak || Spacewatch || — || align=right data-sort-value="0.71" | 710 m || 
|-id=832 bgcolor=#d6d6d6
| 357832 ||  || — || October 22, 2005 || Kitt Peak || Spacewatch || — || align=right | 3.2 km || 
|-id=833 bgcolor=#fefefe
| 357833 ||  || — || October 22, 2005 || Kitt Peak || Spacewatch || FLO || align=right data-sort-value="0.56" | 560 m || 
|-id=834 bgcolor=#fefefe
| 357834 ||  || — || October 24, 2005 || Kitt Peak || Spacewatch || — || align=right data-sort-value="0.79" | 790 m || 
|-id=835 bgcolor=#d6d6d6
| 357835 ||  || — || October 24, 2005 || Kitt Peak || Spacewatch || THM || align=right | 2.5 km || 
|-id=836 bgcolor=#d6d6d6
| 357836 ||  || — || October 24, 2005 || Kitt Peak || Spacewatch || VER || align=right | 3.0 km || 
|-id=837 bgcolor=#E9E9E9
| 357837 ||  || — || September 27, 2005 || Kitt Peak || Spacewatch || — || align=right | 2.2 km || 
|-id=838 bgcolor=#d6d6d6
| 357838 ||  || — || October 25, 2005 || Mount Lemmon || Mount Lemmon Survey || — || align=right | 2.3 km || 
|-id=839 bgcolor=#d6d6d6
| 357839 ||  || — || October 25, 2005 || Catalina || CSS || — || align=right | 3.8 km || 
|-id=840 bgcolor=#d6d6d6
| 357840 ||  || — || October 26, 2005 || Kitt Peak || Spacewatch || — || align=right | 3.8 km || 
|-id=841 bgcolor=#d6d6d6
| 357841 ||  || — || October 26, 2005 || Kitt Peak || Spacewatch || HYG || align=right | 3.1 km || 
|-id=842 bgcolor=#d6d6d6
| 357842 ||  || — || October 26, 2005 || Kitt Peak || Spacewatch || — || align=right | 2.2 km || 
|-id=843 bgcolor=#d6d6d6
| 357843 ||  || — || October 24, 2005 || Kitt Peak || Spacewatch || — || align=right | 2.4 km || 
|-id=844 bgcolor=#d6d6d6
| 357844 ||  || — || October 25, 2005 || Mount Lemmon || Mount Lemmon Survey || THM || align=right | 3.0 km || 
|-id=845 bgcolor=#d6d6d6
| 357845 ||  || — || October 27, 2005 || Mount Lemmon || Mount Lemmon Survey || THM || align=right | 2.3 km || 
|-id=846 bgcolor=#d6d6d6
| 357846 ||  || — || October 27, 2005 || Mount Lemmon || Mount Lemmon Survey || — || align=right | 2.6 km || 
|-id=847 bgcolor=#d6d6d6
| 357847 ||  || — || October 27, 2005 || Mount Lemmon || Mount Lemmon Survey || HYG || align=right | 2.9 km || 
|-id=848 bgcolor=#d6d6d6
| 357848 ||  || — || October 22, 2005 || Kitt Peak || Spacewatch || — || align=right | 3.6 km || 
|-id=849 bgcolor=#d6d6d6
| 357849 ||  || — || October 25, 2005 || Kitt Peak || Spacewatch || — || align=right | 3.7 km || 
|-id=850 bgcolor=#d6d6d6
| 357850 ||  || — || October 27, 2005 || Kitt Peak || Spacewatch || — || align=right | 5.2 km || 
|-id=851 bgcolor=#d6d6d6
| 357851 ||  || — || October 25, 2005 || Kitt Peak || Spacewatch || — || align=right | 3.9 km || 
|-id=852 bgcolor=#d6d6d6
| 357852 ||  || — || October 25, 2005 || Kitt Peak || Spacewatch || — || align=right | 3.4 km || 
|-id=853 bgcolor=#d6d6d6
| 357853 ||  || — || October 25, 2005 || Kitt Peak || Spacewatch || — || align=right | 3.3 km || 
|-id=854 bgcolor=#d6d6d6
| 357854 ||  || — || October 25, 2005 || Kitt Peak || Spacewatch || HYG || align=right | 3.1 km || 
|-id=855 bgcolor=#d6d6d6
| 357855 ||  || — || October 25, 2005 || Kitt Peak || Spacewatch || — || align=right | 2.9 km || 
|-id=856 bgcolor=#d6d6d6
| 357856 ||  || — || October 23, 2005 || Catalina || CSS || — || align=right | 3.8 km || 
|-id=857 bgcolor=#d6d6d6
| 357857 ||  || — || October 24, 2005 || Kitt Peak || Spacewatch || — || align=right | 2.9 km || 
|-id=858 bgcolor=#d6d6d6
| 357858 ||  || — || October 25, 2005 || Kitt Peak || Spacewatch || — || align=right | 3.5 km || 
|-id=859 bgcolor=#d6d6d6
| 357859 ||  || — || October 27, 2005 || Kitt Peak || Spacewatch || — || align=right | 2.5 km || 
|-id=860 bgcolor=#d6d6d6
| 357860 ||  || — || October 28, 2005 || Catalina || CSS || — || align=right | 4.4 km || 
|-id=861 bgcolor=#d6d6d6
| 357861 ||  || — || October 24, 2005 || Kitt Peak || Spacewatch || EOS || align=right | 2.6 km || 
|-id=862 bgcolor=#d6d6d6
| 357862 ||  || — || October 26, 2005 || Kitt Peak || Spacewatch || — || align=right | 2.6 km || 
|-id=863 bgcolor=#d6d6d6
| 357863 ||  || — || October 26, 2005 || Kitt Peak || Spacewatch || EOS || align=right | 2.3 km || 
|-id=864 bgcolor=#fefefe
| 357864 ||  || — || October 26, 2005 || Kitt Peak || Spacewatch || — || align=right data-sort-value="0.72" | 720 m || 
|-id=865 bgcolor=#fefefe
| 357865 ||  || — || October 26, 2005 || Kitt Peak || Spacewatch || — || align=right data-sort-value="0.62" | 620 m || 
|-id=866 bgcolor=#d6d6d6
| 357866 ||  || — || October 27, 2005 || Mount Lemmon || Mount Lemmon Survey || — || align=right | 3.2 km || 
|-id=867 bgcolor=#d6d6d6
| 357867 ||  || — || October 28, 2005 || Kitt Peak || Spacewatch || — || align=right | 2.9 km || 
|-id=868 bgcolor=#fefefe
| 357868 ||  || — || October 28, 2005 || Mount Lemmon || Mount Lemmon Survey || — || align=right data-sort-value="0.68" | 680 m || 
|-id=869 bgcolor=#d6d6d6
| 357869 ||  || — || October 30, 2005 || Mount Lemmon || Mount Lemmon Survey || — || align=right | 3.0 km || 
|-id=870 bgcolor=#d6d6d6
| 357870 ||  || — || October 29, 2005 || Catalina || CSS || — || align=right | 3.6 km || 
|-id=871 bgcolor=#d6d6d6
| 357871 ||  || — || October 27, 2005 || Kitt Peak || Spacewatch || — || align=right | 2.5 km || 
|-id=872 bgcolor=#d6d6d6
| 357872 ||  || — || October 27, 2005 || Kitt Peak || Spacewatch || — || align=right | 4.7 km || 
|-id=873 bgcolor=#d6d6d6
| 357873 ||  || — || October 27, 2005 || Kitt Peak || Spacewatch || EOS || align=right | 2.4 km || 
|-id=874 bgcolor=#d6d6d6
| 357874 ||  || — || October 28, 2005 || Mount Lemmon || Mount Lemmon Survey || THM || align=right | 2.4 km || 
|-id=875 bgcolor=#d6d6d6
| 357875 ||  || — || October 27, 2005 || Kitt Peak || Spacewatch || EOS || align=right | 3.1 km || 
|-id=876 bgcolor=#d6d6d6
| 357876 ||  || — || October 27, 2005 || Kitt Peak || Spacewatch || EOS || align=right | 2.2 km || 
|-id=877 bgcolor=#d6d6d6
| 357877 ||  || — || October 25, 2005 || Kitt Peak || Spacewatch || — || align=right | 4.0 km || 
|-id=878 bgcolor=#d6d6d6
| 357878 ||  || — || October 25, 2005 || Mount Lemmon || Mount Lemmon Survey || THM || align=right | 2.3 km || 
|-id=879 bgcolor=#d6d6d6
| 357879 ||  || — || October 28, 2005 || Kitt Peak || Spacewatch || 7:4 || align=right | 2.5 km || 
|-id=880 bgcolor=#d6d6d6
| 357880 ||  || — || October 31, 2005 || Kitt Peak || Spacewatch || — || align=right | 2.3 km || 
|-id=881 bgcolor=#d6d6d6
| 357881 ||  || — || October 29, 2005 || Catalina || CSS || EOS || align=right | 2.6 km || 
|-id=882 bgcolor=#d6d6d6
| 357882 ||  || — || October 29, 2005 || Palomar || NEAT || TIR || align=right | 3.6 km || 
|-id=883 bgcolor=#d6d6d6
| 357883 ||  || — || October 30, 2005 || Catalina || CSS || — || align=right | 3.6 km || 
|-id=884 bgcolor=#d6d6d6
| 357884 ||  || — || October 30, 2005 || Kitt Peak || Spacewatch || VER || align=right | 3.2 km || 
|-id=885 bgcolor=#d6d6d6
| 357885 ||  || — || October 22, 2005 || Palomar || NEAT || — || align=right | 3.0 km || 
|-id=886 bgcolor=#d6d6d6
| 357886 ||  || — || October 25, 2005 || Kitt Peak || Spacewatch || EOS || align=right | 2.2 km || 
|-id=887 bgcolor=#d6d6d6
| 357887 ||  || — || October 26, 2005 || Kitt Peak || Spacewatch || — || align=right | 3.0 km || 
|-id=888 bgcolor=#d6d6d6
| 357888 ||  || — || October 30, 2005 || Mount Lemmon || Mount Lemmon Survey || — || align=right | 5.5 km || 
|-id=889 bgcolor=#d6d6d6
| 357889 ||  || — || October 22, 2005 || Apache Point || A. C. Becker || — || align=right | 3.1 km || 
|-id=890 bgcolor=#d6d6d6
| 357890 ||  || — || October 25, 2005 || Apache Point || A. C. Becker || — || align=right | 2.0 km || 
|-id=891 bgcolor=#d6d6d6
| 357891 ||  || — || October 26, 2005 || Apache Point || A. C. Becker || — || align=right | 3.6 km || 
|-id=892 bgcolor=#d6d6d6
| 357892 ||  || — || October 26, 2005 || Apache Point || A. C. Becker || — || align=right | 2.9 km || 
|-id=893 bgcolor=#d6d6d6
| 357893 ||  || — || October 26, 2005 || Apache Point || A. C. Becker || — || align=right | 3.3 km || 
|-id=894 bgcolor=#d6d6d6
| 357894 ||  || — || October 26, 2005 || Apache Point || A. C. Becker || — || align=right | 2.9 km || 
|-id=895 bgcolor=#d6d6d6
| 357895 ||  || — || October 26, 2005 || Apache Point || A. C. Becker || — || align=right | 2.6 km || 
|-id=896 bgcolor=#d6d6d6
| 357896 ||  || — || October 27, 2005 || Apache Point || A. C. Becker || — || align=right | 2.4 km || 
|-id=897 bgcolor=#d6d6d6
| 357897 ||  || — || October 27, 2005 || Apache Point || A. C. Becker || — || align=right | 2.9 km || 
|-id=898 bgcolor=#d6d6d6
| 357898 ||  || — || November 4, 2005 || Anderson Mesa || LONEOS || — || align=right | 5.0 km || 
|-id=899 bgcolor=#d6d6d6
| 357899 ||  || — || November 3, 2005 || Mount Lemmon || Mount Lemmon Survey || EUP || align=right | 4.6 km || 
|-id=900 bgcolor=#d6d6d6
| 357900 ||  || — || November 4, 2005 || Kitt Peak || Spacewatch || — || align=right | 3.1 km || 
|}

357901–358000 

|-bgcolor=#d6d6d6
| 357901 ||  || — || November 4, 2005 || Mount Lemmon || Mount Lemmon Survey || fast? || align=right | 3.3 km || 
|-id=902 bgcolor=#d6d6d6
| 357902 ||  || — || November 4, 2005 || Kitt Peak || Spacewatch || — || align=right | 2.2 km || 
|-id=903 bgcolor=#d6d6d6
| 357903 ||  || — || November 1, 2005 || Mount Lemmon || Mount Lemmon Survey || KOR || align=right | 1.3 km || 
|-id=904 bgcolor=#fefefe
| 357904 ||  || — || November 1, 2005 || Mount Lemmon || Mount Lemmon Survey || — || align=right data-sort-value="0.62" | 620 m || 
|-id=905 bgcolor=#fefefe
| 357905 ||  || — || November 1, 2005 || Mount Lemmon || Mount Lemmon Survey || — || align=right data-sort-value="0.69" | 690 m || 
|-id=906 bgcolor=#d6d6d6
| 357906 ||  || — || November 4, 2005 || Mount Lemmon || Mount Lemmon Survey || 7:4 || align=right | 3.4 km || 
|-id=907 bgcolor=#d6d6d6
| 357907 ||  || — || November 6, 2005 || Kitt Peak || Spacewatch || — || align=right | 3.3 km || 
|-id=908 bgcolor=#d6d6d6
| 357908 ||  || — || November 6, 2005 || Mount Lemmon || Mount Lemmon Survey || — || align=right | 3.1 km || 
|-id=909 bgcolor=#d6d6d6
| 357909 ||  || — || November 11, 2005 || Kitt Peak || Spacewatch || — || align=right | 2.8 km || 
|-id=910 bgcolor=#d6d6d6
| 357910 ||  || — || November 1, 2005 || Apache Point || A. C. Becker || LAU || align=right | 1.1 km || 
|-id=911 bgcolor=#d6d6d6
| 357911 ||  || — || November 1, 2005 || Apache Point || A. C. Becker || EOS || align=right | 2.1 km || 
|-id=912 bgcolor=#d6d6d6
| 357912 ||  || — || November 20, 2005 || Catalina || CSS || — || align=right | 4.1 km || 
|-id=913 bgcolor=#d6d6d6
| 357913 ||  || — || November 20, 2005 || Catalina || CSS || — || align=right | 4.4 km || 
|-id=914 bgcolor=#d6d6d6
| 357914 ||  || — || November 21, 2005 || Kitt Peak || Spacewatch || THM || align=right | 2.1 km || 
|-id=915 bgcolor=#d6d6d6
| 357915 ||  || — || November 22, 2005 || Kitt Peak || Spacewatch || — || align=right | 4.6 km || 
|-id=916 bgcolor=#d6d6d6
| 357916 ||  || — || November 6, 2005 || Mount Lemmon || Mount Lemmon Survey || — || align=right | 3.4 km || 
|-id=917 bgcolor=#d6d6d6
| 357917 ||  || — || October 29, 2005 || Mount Lemmon || Mount Lemmon Survey || — || align=right | 3.4 km || 
|-id=918 bgcolor=#d6d6d6
| 357918 ||  || — || November 21, 2005 || Kitt Peak || Spacewatch || — || align=right | 4.2 km || 
|-id=919 bgcolor=#d6d6d6
| 357919 ||  || — || November 21, 2005 || Catalina || CSS || HYG || align=right | 4.8 km || 
|-id=920 bgcolor=#d6d6d6
| 357920 ||  || — || November 22, 2005 || Kitt Peak || Spacewatch || — || align=right | 4.3 km || 
|-id=921 bgcolor=#fefefe
| 357921 ||  || — || November 25, 2005 || Kitt Peak || Spacewatch || — || align=right data-sort-value="0.53" | 530 m || 
|-id=922 bgcolor=#fefefe
| 357922 ||  || — || November 26, 2005 || Kitt Peak || Spacewatch || — || align=right data-sort-value="0.66" | 660 m || 
|-id=923 bgcolor=#fefefe
| 357923 ||  || — || November 25, 2005 || Kitt Peak || Spacewatch || FLO || align=right data-sort-value="0.55" | 550 m || 
|-id=924 bgcolor=#d6d6d6
| 357924 ||  || — || November 25, 2005 || Mount Lemmon || Mount Lemmon Survey || — || align=right | 3.3 km || 
|-id=925 bgcolor=#fefefe
| 357925 ||  || — || November 25, 2005 || Mount Lemmon || Mount Lemmon Survey || — || align=right data-sort-value="0.62" | 620 m || 
|-id=926 bgcolor=#d6d6d6
| 357926 ||  || — || November 26, 2005 || Mount Lemmon || Mount Lemmon Survey || — || align=right | 2.4 km || 
|-id=927 bgcolor=#d6d6d6
| 357927 ||  || — || November 30, 2005 || Kitt Peak || Spacewatch || — || align=right | 4.1 km || 
|-id=928 bgcolor=#d6d6d6
| 357928 ||  || — || November 25, 2005 || Kitt Peak || Spacewatch || — || align=right | 3.8 km || 
|-id=929 bgcolor=#d6d6d6
| 357929 ||  || — || November 25, 2005 || Kitt Peak || Spacewatch || VER || align=right | 3.2 km || 
|-id=930 bgcolor=#d6d6d6
| 357930 ||  || — || November 10, 2005 || Mount Lemmon || Mount Lemmon Survey || THM || align=right | 2.7 km || 
|-id=931 bgcolor=#fefefe
| 357931 ||  || — || November 30, 2005 || Kitt Peak || Spacewatch || — || align=right data-sort-value="0.79" | 790 m || 
|-id=932 bgcolor=#fefefe
| 357932 ||  || — || November 26, 2005 || Kitt Peak || Spacewatch || — || align=right data-sort-value="0.55" | 550 m || 
|-id=933 bgcolor=#d6d6d6
| 357933 ||  || — || December 2, 2005 || Kitt Peak || Spacewatch || — || align=right | 4.0 km || 
|-id=934 bgcolor=#d6d6d6
| 357934 ||  || — || December 5, 2005 || Mount Lemmon || Mount Lemmon Survey || THM || align=right | 2.3 km || 
|-id=935 bgcolor=#fefefe
| 357935 ||  || — || December 1, 2005 || Kitt Peak || M. W. Buie || NYS || align=right data-sort-value="0.76" | 760 m || 
|-id=936 bgcolor=#fefefe
| 357936 ||  || — || December 21, 2005 || Kitt Peak || Spacewatch || — || align=right data-sort-value="0.60" | 600 m || 
|-id=937 bgcolor=#fefefe
| 357937 ||  || — || December 21, 2005 || Kitt Peak || Spacewatch || FLO || align=right data-sort-value="0.51" | 510 m || 
|-id=938 bgcolor=#fefefe
| 357938 ||  || — || December 24, 2005 || Kitt Peak || Spacewatch || — || align=right data-sort-value="0.71" | 710 m || 
|-id=939 bgcolor=#fefefe
| 357939 ||  || — || December 25, 2005 || Kitt Peak || Spacewatch || FLO || align=right data-sort-value="0.62" | 620 m || 
|-id=940 bgcolor=#fefefe
| 357940 ||  || — || December 25, 2005 || Kitt Peak || Spacewatch || — || align=right data-sort-value="0.57" | 570 m || 
|-id=941 bgcolor=#fefefe
| 357941 ||  || — || December 25, 2005 || Mount Lemmon || Mount Lemmon Survey || — || align=right data-sort-value="0.67" | 670 m || 
|-id=942 bgcolor=#d6d6d6
| 357942 ||  || — || December 26, 2005 || Mount Lemmon || Mount Lemmon Survey || — || align=right | 5.3 km || 
|-id=943 bgcolor=#fefefe
| 357943 ||  || — || December 22, 2005 || Kitt Peak || Spacewatch || — || align=right data-sort-value="0.70" | 700 m || 
|-id=944 bgcolor=#d6d6d6
| 357944 ||  || — || December 23, 2005 || Kitt Peak || Spacewatch || — || align=right | 2.9 km || 
|-id=945 bgcolor=#fefefe
| 357945 ||  || — || December 25, 2005 || Kitt Peak || Spacewatch || FLO || align=right data-sort-value="0.72" | 720 m || 
|-id=946 bgcolor=#d6d6d6
| 357946 ||  || — || October 25, 2005 || Mount Lemmon || Mount Lemmon Survey || EOS || align=right | 2.0 km || 
|-id=947 bgcolor=#d6d6d6
| 357947 ||  || — || December 24, 2005 || Kitt Peak || Spacewatch || — || align=right | 3.7 km || 
|-id=948 bgcolor=#fefefe
| 357948 ||  || — || December 25, 2005 || Kitt Peak || Spacewatch || — || align=right data-sort-value="0.64" | 640 m || 
|-id=949 bgcolor=#fefefe
| 357949 ||  || — || December 26, 2005 || Kitt Peak || Spacewatch || — || align=right data-sort-value="0.71" | 710 m || 
|-id=950 bgcolor=#fefefe
| 357950 ||  || — || December 30, 2005 || Anderson Mesa || LONEOS || — || align=right | 1.1 km || 
|-id=951 bgcolor=#fefefe
| 357951 ||  || — || December 24, 2005 || Socorro || LINEAR || — || align=right data-sort-value="0.75" | 750 m || 
|-id=952 bgcolor=#fefefe
| 357952 ||  || — || December 27, 2005 || Mount Lemmon || Mount Lemmon Survey || V || align=right data-sort-value="0.52" | 520 m || 
|-id=953 bgcolor=#fefefe
| 357953 ||  || — || March 23, 2003 || Apache Point || SDSS || V || align=right data-sort-value="0.62" | 620 m || 
|-id=954 bgcolor=#fefefe
| 357954 ||  || — || December 25, 2005 || Mount Lemmon || Mount Lemmon Survey || — || align=right data-sort-value="0.87" | 870 m || 
|-id=955 bgcolor=#fefefe
| 357955 ||  || — || December 30, 2005 || Kitt Peak || Spacewatch || — || align=right data-sort-value="0.67" | 670 m || 
|-id=956 bgcolor=#FA8072
| 357956 ||  || — || January 5, 2006 || Catalina || CSS || — || align=right | 1.4 km || 
|-id=957 bgcolor=#fefefe
| 357957 ||  || — || January 4, 2006 || Kitt Peak || Spacewatch || FLO || align=right data-sort-value="0.53" | 530 m || 
|-id=958 bgcolor=#fefefe
| 357958 ||  || — || January 6, 2006 || Kitt Peak || Spacewatch || FLO || align=right data-sort-value="0.81" | 810 m || 
|-id=959 bgcolor=#fefefe
| 357959 ||  || — || January 6, 2006 || Kitt Peak || Spacewatch || — || align=right data-sort-value="0.51" | 510 m || 
|-id=960 bgcolor=#fefefe
| 357960 ||  || — || January 20, 2006 || Catalina || CSS || FLO || align=right data-sort-value="0.94" | 940 m || 
|-id=961 bgcolor=#fefefe
| 357961 ||  || — || January 21, 2006 || Kitt Peak || Spacewatch || — || align=right data-sort-value="0.69" | 690 m || 
|-id=962 bgcolor=#fefefe
| 357962 ||  || — || January 20, 2006 || Kitt Peak || Spacewatch || NYS || align=right data-sort-value="0.63" | 630 m || 
|-id=963 bgcolor=#fefefe
| 357963 ||  || — || January 21, 2006 || Kitt Peak || Spacewatch || V || align=right data-sort-value="0.63" | 630 m || 
|-id=964 bgcolor=#fefefe
| 357964 ||  || — || January 21, 2006 || Kitt Peak || Spacewatch || — || align=right | 1.0 km || 
|-id=965 bgcolor=#fefefe
| 357965 ||  || — || January 23, 2006 || Kitt Peak || Spacewatch || V || align=right data-sort-value="0.74" | 740 m || 
|-id=966 bgcolor=#fefefe
| 357966 ||  || — || January 22, 2006 || Mount Lemmon || Mount Lemmon Survey || — || align=right data-sort-value="0.59" | 590 m || 
|-id=967 bgcolor=#fefefe
| 357967 ||  || — || January 23, 2006 || Kitt Peak || Spacewatch || V || align=right data-sort-value="0.80" | 800 m || 
|-id=968 bgcolor=#fefefe
| 357968 ||  || — || January 23, 2006 || Kitt Peak || Spacewatch || FLO || align=right data-sort-value="0.57" | 570 m || 
|-id=969 bgcolor=#fefefe
| 357969 ||  || — || January 23, 2006 || Kitt Peak || Spacewatch || V || align=right data-sort-value="0.70" | 700 m || 
|-id=970 bgcolor=#fefefe
| 357970 ||  || — || January 26, 2006 || Kitt Peak || Spacewatch || V || align=right data-sort-value="0.85" | 850 m || 
|-id=971 bgcolor=#fefefe
| 357971 ||  || — || January 25, 2006 || Kitt Peak || Spacewatch || — || align=right data-sort-value="0.64" | 640 m || 
|-id=972 bgcolor=#fefefe
| 357972 ||  || — || January 25, 2006 || Kitt Peak || Spacewatch || — || align=right data-sort-value="0.80" | 800 m || 
|-id=973 bgcolor=#fefefe
| 357973 ||  || — || January 26, 2006 || Kitt Peak || Spacewatch || FLO || align=right data-sort-value="0.58" | 580 m || 
|-id=974 bgcolor=#fefefe
| 357974 ||  || — || January 24, 2006 || Anderson Mesa || LONEOS || FLO || align=right data-sort-value="0.72" | 720 m || 
|-id=975 bgcolor=#fefefe
| 357975 ||  || — || January 25, 2006 || Kitt Peak || Spacewatch || — || align=right data-sort-value="0.92" | 920 m || 
|-id=976 bgcolor=#fefefe
| 357976 ||  || — || January 25, 2006 || Kitt Peak || Spacewatch || — || align=right data-sort-value="0.87" | 870 m || 
|-id=977 bgcolor=#fefefe
| 357977 ||  || — || January 26, 2006 || Mount Lemmon || Mount Lemmon Survey || V || align=right data-sort-value="0.57" | 570 m || 
|-id=978 bgcolor=#fefefe
| 357978 ||  || — || January 10, 2006 || Kitt Peak || Spacewatch || — || align=right data-sort-value="0.66" | 660 m || 
|-id=979 bgcolor=#fefefe
| 357979 ||  || — || January 28, 2006 || Mount Lemmon || Mount Lemmon Survey || — || align=right data-sort-value="0.89" | 890 m || 
|-id=980 bgcolor=#fefefe
| 357980 ||  || — || January 30, 2006 || Kitt Peak || Spacewatch || NYS || align=right data-sort-value="0.71" | 710 m || 
|-id=981 bgcolor=#fefefe
| 357981 ||  || — || January 30, 2006 || Kitt Peak || Spacewatch || — || align=right data-sort-value="0.68" | 680 m || 
|-id=982 bgcolor=#fefefe
| 357982 ||  || — || January 31, 2006 || Kitt Peak || Spacewatch || — || align=right data-sort-value="0.66" | 660 m || 
|-id=983 bgcolor=#fefefe
| 357983 ||  || — || January 26, 2006 || Catalina || CSS || — || align=right | 1.0 km || 
|-id=984 bgcolor=#fefefe
| 357984 ||  || — || January 7, 2006 || Mount Lemmon || Mount Lemmon Survey || — || align=right data-sort-value="0.85" | 850 m || 
|-id=985 bgcolor=#fefefe
| 357985 ||  || — || February 2, 2006 || Kitt Peak || Spacewatch || FLO || align=right data-sort-value="0.56" | 560 m || 
|-id=986 bgcolor=#fefefe
| 357986 ||  || — || February 3, 2006 || Socorro || LINEAR || — || align=right data-sort-value="0.70" | 700 m || 
|-id=987 bgcolor=#fefefe
| 357987 ||  || — || February 1, 2006 || Mount Lemmon || Mount Lemmon Survey || — || align=right data-sort-value="0.79" | 790 m || 
|-id=988 bgcolor=#fefefe
| 357988 ||  || — || February 20, 2006 || Catalina || CSS || — || align=right data-sort-value="0.99" | 990 m || 
|-id=989 bgcolor=#fefefe
| 357989 ||  || — || February 22, 2006 || Catalina || CSS || V || align=right data-sort-value="0.89" | 890 m || 
|-id=990 bgcolor=#fefefe
| 357990 ||  || — || February 22, 2006 || Catalina || CSS || — || align=right | 1.2 km || 
|-id=991 bgcolor=#fefefe
| 357991 ||  || — || February 20, 2006 || Kitt Peak || Spacewatch || — || align=right data-sort-value="0.60" | 600 m || 
|-id=992 bgcolor=#fefefe
| 357992 ||  || — || February 20, 2006 || Kitt Peak || Spacewatch || — || align=right data-sort-value="0.71" | 710 m || 
|-id=993 bgcolor=#fefefe
| 357993 ||  || — || February 20, 2006 || Kitt Peak || Spacewatch || — || align=right | 1.1 km || 
|-id=994 bgcolor=#fefefe
| 357994 ||  || — || February 20, 2006 || Kitt Peak || Spacewatch || — || align=right data-sort-value="0.84" | 840 m || 
|-id=995 bgcolor=#fefefe
| 357995 ||  || — || February 20, 2006 || Kitt Peak || Spacewatch || MAS || align=right data-sort-value="0.65" | 650 m || 
|-id=996 bgcolor=#fefefe
| 357996 ||  || — || February 21, 2006 || Mount Lemmon || Mount Lemmon Survey || — || align=right data-sort-value="0.77" | 770 m || 
|-id=997 bgcolor=#fefefe
| 357997 ||  || — || February 21, 2006 || Catalina || CSS || NYS || align=right data-sort-value="0.67" | 670 m || 
|-id=998 bgcolor=#fefefe
| 357998 ||  || — || February 24, 2006 || Kitt Peak || Spacewatch || — || align=right data-sort-value="0.91" | 910 m || 
|-id=999 bgcolor=#fefefe
| 357999 ||  || — || February 24, 2006 || Mount Lemmon || Mount Lemmon Survey || MAS || align=right data-sort-value="0.71" | 710 m || 
|-id=000 bgcolor=#fefefe
| 358000 ||  || — || February 22, 2006 || Calvin-Rehoboth || Calvin–Rehoboth Obs. || — || align=right | 1.6 km || 
|}

References

External links 
 Discovery Circumstances: Numbered Minor Planets (355001)–(360000) (IAU Minor Planet Center)

0357